Birds evolved from certain feathered theropod dinosaurs, and there is no real dividing line between birds and non-avian dinosaurs except that some of the former survived the Cretaceous–Paleogene extinction event while the latter did not. For the purposes of this article, a 'bird' is considered to be any member of the clade Aves in the broadest sense. Some dinosaur groups which may or may not be true birds are listed below under Proto-birds.

This page contains a listing of prehistoric bird taxa only known from completely fossilized specimens. These extinctions took place before the Late Quaternary and thus took place in the absence of significant human interference. While the earliest hominids had been eating birds and especially their eggs, human population and technology was simply insufficient to seriously affect healthy bird populations until the Upper Paleolithic Revolution. Rather, reasons for the extinctions listed here are stochastic abiotic events such as bolide impacts, climate changes due to orbital shifts, mass volcanic eruptions etc. Alternatively, species may have gone extinct due to evolutionary displacement by successor or competitor taxa – it is notable that an extremely large number of seabirds have gone extinct during the mid-Tertiary; this seems at least partly due to competition by the contemporary radiation of marine mammals.

The relationships of these taxa are often hard to determine, as many are known only from very fragmentary remains and due to the complete fossilization precluding analysis of information from DNA, RNA or protein sequencing. The taxa listed in this article should be classified with the Wikipedia conservation status category "Fossil".

Before the late 19th century, when minerals were still considered one of the kingdoms of binomial nomenclature, fossils were often treated according to a parallel taxonomy. Rather than assigning them to animal or plant genera, they were treated as mineral genera and given binomial names typically using Osteornis ("bone-bird") or Ornitholithus ("bird fossil") as "genus". The latter name, however, is still in use for an oogenus of fossil bird eggs. Also, other animals (in particular pterosaurs) were placed in these "genera". In sources pre-dating the Linnean system, the above terms are also seen in the more extensive descriptions used to name taxa back then.

Taxonomic list of fossil prehistoric birds
Higher-level taxa are presented in likely or suspected phylogenetic order. Genus-level taxa and lower are sorted chronologically, in ascending order (i.e., older taxa first).

The higher-level groups of non-Neornithes are arranged based on the phylogeny proposed by Luis Chiappe, updated and expanded to incorporate recent research. The categories are inclusive in ascending order.

Taxonomic assignments, especially in the pygostylian to early neornithine genera, are still very provisional and subject to quite frequent change.

Basal Avialae (extinct)
The most primitive "birds", usually still possessing a long bony tail with generally unfused vertebrae. Not all of these may be on the line of bird ancestors; whether they are not closer to other theropods groups than to the Avialae remains to be thoroughly tested (see Xiaotingia).

 †Anchiornis huxleyi 
 †Aurornis xui 
 †Balaur bondoc 
 †Jixiangornis orientalis 
 †Xiaotingia zhengi 
 †Yandangornithiformes 
 †Yandangornithidae 
 †Yandangornis longicaudatus  (Late Cretaceous)
 †Archaeopterygiformes 
 †Archaeopterygidae  [Archaeornithidae ; Archaeopteridae ; Archornithidae ]a
 †Wellnhoferia grandis  (Late Jurassic) – possible synonym of Archaeopteryx
 †Archaeopteryx  [Archaeornis ; Griphornis ; Griphosaurus ] (Late Jurassic)
 †Jeholornithiformes 
 †Jeholornithidae 
 †Dalianraptor cuhe 
 †Jeholornis  [Shenzhouraptor ] (Early Cretaceous)

Basal Pygostylia (extinct)
The earliest birds with a modern pygostyle: a reduction and fusion of the tail vertebrae; possibly a paraphyletic group. Two types of pygostyle are known, a rod-shaped one found in Confuciusornithidae, Enantiornithes and some non-avian theropods such as Nomingia, and a plowshare-shaped one, only known in the lineage leading to modern birds. It is not certain that the pygostyles found in birds are indeed synapomorphies.

 †Chongmingia zhengi 
 †Confuciusornithiformes 
 †Proornis coreae  (nomen nudum)
 †Zhongornis haoae  - confuciusornithid?
 †Confuciusornithidae 
 †Changchengornis hengdaoziensis  (Early Cretaceous)
 †Eoconfuciusornis zhengi  (Early Cretaceous)
 †Evgenavis nobilis  
 †Confuciusornis  [Jinzhouornis Hou et al. 2002] (Early Cretaceous)
 †Omnivoropterygiformes  [Sapeornithiformes ]
 †Omnivoropterygidae  [Sapeornithidae ] 
 †Omnivoropteryx sinousaorum  (Early Cretaceous)
 †Sapeornis chaoyangensis  [Didactylornis jii ; Sapeornis angustis ; Shenshiornis primita ] (Early Cretaceous)

Enantiornithes (extinct)

The taxonomic list of enantiornithine groups presented here follows a summary published by Thomas R. Holz, Jr. in 2011.

†Enantiornithes
 Basal Enantiornithes and Enantiornithes incerta sedis
†Cerebavis cenomanica  (Late Cretaceous)
†Cruralispennia multidonta 
†Dalingheornis liweii  (Early Cretaceous)
†Dunhuangia cuii  
†Elsornis keni  (Late Cretaceous)
†Feitianius paradisi 
†Holbotia ponomarenkoi  [Holbotia ponomarenkoi ]
†Houornis caudatus  [Cathayornis caudatus ]
†Laevisoolithidae  [Subtiliolithidae] [ootaxa]
†Laevisoolithus sochavai  [ootaxa]
†Subtiliolithus microtuberculatus  [ootaxa]
†Tipoolithus achloujensis  [ootaxa]
†Linyiornis amoena 
†Monoenantiornis sihedangia 
†Paraprotopteryx gracilis  (Early Cretaceous)
†Parvavis chuxiongensis 
†Piscivorenantiornis inusitatus 
†Pterygornis dapingfangensis 
†Xiangornis shenmi  (Jiufotang Early Cretaceous of Liaoning)
†Yuanjiawaornis viriosus 
†Kurzholiidae 
†Kuszholia mengi  (Late Cretaceous)
†Iberomesornithiformes 
†Iberomesornithidae 
†Iberomesornis romerali  (Early Cretaceous)
†Liaoningornithiformes 
†Liaoningornithidae 
†Eoalulavis hoyasi  (Early Cretaceous)
†Liaoningornis longidigitris 
 Basal Euenantiornithes
†Catenoleimus anachoretus  (Late Cretaceous)
†Cratoavis cearensis 
†Elbretornis bonapartei  (Late Cretaceous)
†Eocathayornis walkeri  [Eocathayornis walkeri ] (Early Cretaceous)
†Flexomornis howei  (Late Cretaceous)
†Fortunguavis xiaotaizicus 
†Grabauornis lingyuanensis 
†Huoshanornis huji   (Late Cretaceous)
†Largirostrornis sexdentoris  (Early Cretaceous)
†Lectavis bretincola  (Late Cretaceous)
†Martinavis  (Late Cretaceous)
†M. cruzyensis  
†M. vincei  
†M. minor 
†M. saltariensis 
†M. whetstonei 
†Musivavis amabilis  (Early Cretaceous)
†Yungavolucris brevipedalis Chiappe 1993 (Late Cretaceous)
†Liaoxiornithiformes 
†Liaoxiornithidae 
†Liaoxiornis delicatus  [Lingyuanornis parvus ]  (Late Cretaceous)
†Pengornithidae 
†Chiappeavis magnapremaxillo  
†Eopengornis martini  
†Pengornis houi  (Early Cretaceous)
†Parapengornis eurycaudatus 
†Protopterygiformes 
†Protopterygidae 
†Jibeinia luanhera  [Jibeinia luanhera ] (Early Cretaceous)
†Protopteryx fengningensis  (Early Cretaceous)
†Hebeiornis fengningensis  
†Eoenantiornithiformes 
†Eoenantiornithidae 
†Dapingfangornis sentisorhinus  (Early Cretaceous)
†Eoenantiornis buhleri 
†Bohaiornithidae 
†Beiguornis khinganensis 
†Bohaiornis guoi 
†Longusunguis kurochkini 
†Parabohaiornis martini 
†Shenqiornis mengi  (Early Cretaceous)
†Sulcavis geeorum  (Early Cretaceous)
†Zhouornis hani  
†Longipterygiformes  [Boluochiiformes ; Longirostraviformes ]
†Longipterygidae  [Boluochiidae ; Longirostravidae ]
†Boluochia zhengi  (Early Cretaceous)
†Camptodontus yangi  (Early Cretaceous)
†Longipteryx chaoyangensis  (Early Cretaceous)
†Longirostravis hani  (Early Cretaceous)
†Otogornis genghisi  (Early Cretaceous)
†Rapaxavis pani  (Early Cretaceous)
†Shanweiniao cooperorum  (Early Cretaceous)
†Shengjingornis yangi  (Early Cretaceous)
†Cathayornithiformes  [Sinornithiformes ; Euornithiformes ]
†Alethoalaornithidae 
†Alethoalaornis agitornis  (Early Cretaceous)
†Concornithidae 
†Concornis lacustris  (Early Cretaceous)
†Qiliania graffini  (Early Cretaceous)
†Noguerornis gonzalezi  (Early Cretaceous)
†Cathyornithidae  [Sinornithidae ]
†Gracilornis jiufotangensis  (Early Cretaceous)
†Longchengornis sanyanensis  (Early Cretaceous)
†Sinornis santensis  (Early Cretaceous)
†Cathayornis  (Early Cretaceous)
†Enantiornithiformes  [Gobipterygiformes ; Alexornithiformes ]
†Avisauridae 
†Cuspirostrisornis houi  (Early Cretaceous)
†Avisaurus  (Late Cretaceous)
†Bauxitornis mindszentyae (Late Cretaceous)
†Enantiophoenix electrophyla  (Late Cretaceous)
†Halimornis thompsonae  (Late Cretaceous)
†Gettyia  (Late Cretaceous)
†Intiornis inexpectatus (Late Cretaceous)
†Mirarce  (Late Cretaceous)
†Mystiornis cyrili  (Early Cretaceous)
†Neuquenornis volans  (Late Cretaceous)
†Soroavisaurus australis  (Late Cretaceous)
†Gobipterygidae 
†Gobipipus reshetovi 
†Gobipteryx minuta  (Late Cretaceous)
†Vescornis hebeiensis  (Early Cretaceous)
†Enantiornithidae 
†Enantiornis leali  (Late Cretaceous)
†Gurilynia nessovi  (Late Cretaceous)
†Wyleyia valdensis  (Late Cretaceous)
†Nanantius  (Early-?Late Cretaceous)
†Alexornithidae 
†Abavornis bonaparti  (Late Cretaceous)
†Alexornis antecedens  (Late Cretaceous)
†Explorornis  (Late Cretaceous)
†Incolornis  (Late Cretaceous)
†Kizylkumavis cretacea  (Late Cretaceous)
†Lenesornis maltschevskyi  [Ichthyornis maltschevskyi ] (Late Cretaceous)
†Sazavis prisca  (Early Cretaceous)
†Zhyraornis  (Late Cretaceous)

Note that Holtz (2011) also included Zhyraornis in his classification of euenantiornithines, though this genus is more often classified as an ornithuran. Holtz also placed Liaoningornis as an ornithuromorph, though more recent studies have placed it as a close relative of Eoalulavis.

Basal Euornithes (extinct)
Also called "basal Ornithuromorpha". Essentially modern birds, except many still possess a few primitive features such as teeth or wing claws. These have the plowshare-shaped pygostyle and proper tail fan as seen in most living birds. The taxonomy of this group is confusing; the name "Ornithurae" was first proposed by Ernst Haeckel in 1866 and has been revised in meaning several times since.

The following is a list of primitive euornithian genera and those that cannot be confidently referred to any subgroups, following Holtz (2011).

†Archaeorhynchus spathula 
†Changmaornis houi 
†Changzuiornis ahgmi 
†Gargantuavis philoinos 
†Hollanda luceria  [Hollandornis birdus ]
†Horezmavis eocretaceous 
†Hulsanpes perlei  (?Troodontidae)
†Iteravis huchzermeyeri 
†Jianchangornis microdonta 
†Jiuquanornis niui 
†Juehuaornis zhangi 
†Palaeopteryx thomsoni  (dinosaur)
†Platanavis nana 
†Schizooura lii 
†Tingmiatornis arctica 
†Vorona berivotrensis 
†Xinghaiornis lini 
†Yumenornis huangi 
†Zhongjianornis yangi 
†Patagopterygidae 
†Alamitornis minutus 
†Patagopteryx deferrariisi 
†Hongshanornithidae 
?†Archaeornithura meemannae 
†Hongshanornis longicresta  (Early Cretaceous)
†Longicrusavis houi  (Early Cretaceous)
†Parahongshanornis chaoyangensis  (Early Cretaceous)– ornithurine?
†Tianyuornis cheni 
†Chaoyangiiformes 
†Chaoyangiidae  [Chaoyangornithidae ]
†Chaoyangia beishanensis 
†Songlingornithiformes [Aberratiodontiformes ; Yanornithiformes ; Yixianornithiformes ]
†Songlingornithidae  [Aberratiodontidae ; Chaoyangornithidae ; Yanornithidae ; Yixiaornithidae ]
†Piscivoravis lii 
†Songlingornis linghensis  (Early Cretaceous)
†Yixianornis grabaui  (Early Cretaceous)
†Yanornis  [Archaeoraptor ; Archaeovolans ; Aberratiodontus ] (Early Cretaceous)

Note that Holtz also included the genera Eurolimnornis, Holbotia, Palaeocursornis and Piksi as euornitheans, though they have since been re-identified as pterosaurs.

Basal Ornithurae (extinct)
 Limenavis patagonica  (Late Cretaceous)– paleognath?
Palintropidae
 Palintropus retusus  [Cimolopteryx retusa Marsh 1892; Apatornis retusus (Marsh 1892) Brodkorb 1962] (Late Cretaceous) (?Galliformes: Quercymegapodiidae)
†Ambiortiformes 
†Ambiortidae 
†Ambiortus dementjevi  (Late Cretaceous)
†Apsaraviformes 
†Apsaravidae
†Apsaravis ukhaana  (Late Cretaceous)
†Gansuiformes 
†Gansuidae 
†Gansus  (Early Cretaceous)
†Ichthyornithiformes  [Pteropappi ]
†Apatornithidae 
†Apatornis celer  [Ichthyornis celer Marsh 1873] (Late Cretaceous)
†Guildavis tener  [Ichthyornis tener Marsh 1880] (Cretaceous of Wallace County, US)
†Iaceornis marshi  (Late Cretaceous)
†Ichthyornithidae 
 Ichthyornis  [Angelinornis ; Colonosaurus ; Graculavus ; Plegadornis ] (Late Cretaceous)
†Hesperornithiformes   (Large, toothed, loon-like diving birds) 
†Chupkaornis keraorum 
†Potamornis skutchi  (Late Cretaceous)
†Pasquiaornis  (Late Cretaceous)
†Enaliornithidae 
†Enaliornis  [Palaeocolyntus ; Palaeocolymbus ; Pelargonis ; Pelagornis ] (Early Cretaceous)
†Baptornithidae 
†Baptornis  [Parascaniornis ]
†Brodavidae 
Brodavis  (Late Cretaceous)
†Judinornithidae 
†Judinornis nogontsavensis  (Late Cretaceous)
†Hesperornithidae 
†Fumicollis hoffmani 
†Parahesperornis alexi  (Late Cretaceous)
†Hesperornis  [Coniornis ; Lestornis ; Hargeria ; Asiahesperornis ; Canadaga ] (Late Cretaceous)

Neornithes
The subclass that contains all modern birds.

Unresolved and basal forms
These modern birds are known from remains that cannot be placed in relation to any one modern group and are neither autapomorphic enough to assign them to own orders. Especially the Late Cretaceous/early Paleogene taxa are probably basal to several modern orders, while later Paleogene taxa often represent extinct lineages outside the modern families.
†Australornis lovei  (late early Paleocene)
†Gallornis straeleni  (Late Cretaceous)
†Ceramornis major  (Late Cretaceous) – charadriiform?
†"Presbyornithidae" gen. et sp. indet. (Barun Goyot Late Cretaceous of Udan Sayr, Mongolia) - anseriform (presbyornithid)?
†Torotix clemensi  (Late Cretaceous) – pelecaniform, charadriiform, procellariiform or phoenicopteriform
Neornithes incerta sedis  (Nemegt Late Cretaceous of S Mongolia) - phalacrocoracid?
Neornithes incerta sedis AMNH FR 25272 (Lance Creek Late Cretaceous of Converse County, US) - phalacrocoracid?
Neornithes incerta sedis PVPH 237 (Portezuelo Late Cretaceous of Sierra de Portezuelo, Argentina) - galliform?
Neornithes incerta sedis UCMP 117598 (Hell Creek Late Cretaceous of Bug Creek West, US)
Neornithes incerta sedis UCMP 117599 (Hell Creek Late Cretaceous of Bug Creek West, US) – anseriform?
†"Lonchodytes" pterygius  (Late Cretaceous/?Early Palaeocene) – charadriiform?
†Novacaesareala hungerfordi  (Late Cretaceous/Early Palaeocene) – related to Torotix?
†"Palaeotringa" vetus  (Lance Late Cretaceous of Wyoming – Hornerstown Late Cretaceous/?Early Palaeocene of New Jersey, US) - gruiform? anseriform (presbyornithid)?
†Volgavis marina  (Early Palaeocene of Volgograd, Russia) – charadriiform? phalacrocoraciform?
†Tshulia litorea  (Late Paleocene of Zhylga, Kazakhstan)
†Eupterornis remensis  (Paleocene of Cernay, France) – charadriiform (larid?)? gaviiform?
†Gradiornis walbeckensis  (Paleocene of Walbeck, Germany) – cariamid?
†"Messelornis" russelli  (Paleocene of Cernay, France) – messelornithid?
†Walbeckornis creber  (Paleocene of Walbeck, Germany) – charadriiform? messelornithid?
Neornithes incerta sedis (Late Paleocene/Early Eocene of Ouled Abdoun Basin, Morocco) – charadriiform, ciconiiform, gruiform?
†Argillipes  (London Clay Early Eocene of England) – galliform?
†A. aurorum 
†A. magnus 
†A. paralectoris 
†Coturnipes cooperi  (Early Eocene of England, and Virginia, US?)– galliform, falconiform?
†Fluviatilavis antunesi  (Early Eocene of Silveirinha, Portugal)– charadriiform?
†Mopsitta tanta  (Early Eocene) – threskiornithid (may belong in Rhynchaeites), psittacid?
†Neanis schucherti  (Early Eocene)– coraciiform (primobucconid), piciform?
†Paleophasianus meleagroides  (Willwood Early Eocene of Bighorn County, US)– galliform (tetraonine or cracid) or gruiform (aramid)?
†Precursor parvus (Early Eocene)– several species? psittaciform (pseudasturid or psittacid) + charadriiform (glareolid)?
†"Precursor" litorum 
†"Precursor" magnus 
†Procuculus minutus  (Early Eocene of Bognor Regis, England)– cuculiform (parvicuculid), coraciiform (primobucconid), close to Primapus?
†Pulchrapollia  (Early Eocene) – psittaciform (pseudasturid or psittacid)?
†P. gracilis 
†P. olsoni  [Primobucco olsoni ]
Neornithes incerta sedis USNM 496384 (Nanjemoy Early Eocene of Virginia, US)– parvicuculid? aegithalornithid?
†Palaeopsittacus georgei  (Early – middle Eocene of NW Europe) – caprimulgiform (podargid?) or quercypsittid?
†Amitabha urbsinterdictensis  (Bridger middle Eocene of Forbidden City, US) - galliform (phasianid) or gruiform (rallid?)?
†Eociconia sangequanensis  (middle Eocene of China)– ciconiiform (ciconiid)?
†Protocypselomorphus manfredkelleri  (middle Eocene of Messel, Germany)– caprimulgiform, apodiform or ancestral to both
†Pumiliornis tessellatus  (middle Eocene of Messel, Germany)
†Ludiortyx hoffmanni  (Late Eocene) – rallid, quercymegapodid? [Includes Tringa hoffmanni ; Palaeortyx blanchardi ; Palaeortyx hoffmanni ; Ludiortyx blanchardi ; Eortyx hoffmanni ]
†Minggangia changgouensis  (Late Eocene of China) – rallid, threskiornithid?
†Petropluvialis simplex  (Late Eocene of England)– may be same as Palaeopapia; anseriform?
†"Phasianus" alfhildae  (Washakie B Late Eocene of Haystack Butte, US)– gruiform, ciconiiform, phoenicopteriform?
†Telecrex grangeri  (Irdin Manha Late Eocene of Chimney Butte, Mongolia)– meleagrid or gruiform (rallid?)
Neornithes incerta sedis AMNH FR 2941 (Irdin Manha Late Eocene of Chimney Butte, China) – falconiform (accipitrid)? gruiform (Eogrus)?
†Zheroia kurochkini  (Late Eocene of Kazakhstan) – gruiform? pelagornithid?
†"Falco" falconellus  (or falconella; Eocene of Wyoming, US) – falconiform (falconid)?
†Agnopterus  (Late Eocene– Late Oligocene of Europe)– phoenicopteriform or anseriform
†A. laurillardi 
†A. sicki 
†A. turgaiensis  [Cygnopterus lambrechti ]
†Plesiocathartes  (Late Eocene–? Early Miocene of SW Europe) - cathartid, leptosomid?
†P. europaeus 
†P. gaillardi
†P. wyomingensis 
†P. major 
†P. geiselensis 
†P. kelleri 
†Botauroides parvus   (Eocene of Wyoming, US) – coliiform?
†Aminornis excavatus  (Deseado Early Oligocene of Rio Deseado, Argentina) – gruiform (aramid)?
†Ciconiopsis antarctica  (Deseado Early Oligocene of Patagonia, Argentina) – ciconiiform (ciconiid)?
†Climacarthrus incompletus  (Deseado Early Oligocene of Argentina) – falconiform (accipitrid)? A nomen dubium
†Cruschedula revola  (Deseado Early Oligocene of Golfo San Jorge, Argentina) Aves incertae sedis; A nomen dubium
†Dolichopterus viator  [Dolicopterus ; Camaskelus ; Camaskelus ; Dolicopterus viator ; Camaskelus palustris ; Camaskelus palustris ] (Early Oligocene of Ronzon, France) – charadriiform (charadriid)? Not Dolicopterus as sometimes claimed
†Loncornis erectus  (Deseado Early Oligocene of Rio Deseado, Argentina)– gruiform (aramid)?
†Loxornis clivus – anatid? (Deseado Early Oligocene of Argentina)
†Manu antiquus  (Early Oligocene) – pelagornithid? procellariiform (diomedeid)?
†Palaeocrex rex  (Early Oligocene of Trigonias Quarry, US) – gruiform (rallid)?
†Palaeopapia eous  [Howardia ; Howardia eous ] (Hampstead Early Oligocene of Isle of Wight, England) – anseriform?
†Paracygnopterus scotti  (Early Oligocene of Belgium and England) – anseriform (anatid)?
†"Pararallus" hassenkampi (Sieblos Dysodil Early Oligocene of Sieblos, Germany)
†Riacama caliginea  (Deseado Early Oligocene of Argentina) – gruiform?
†Smiliornis penetrans  (Deseado Early Oligocene of Argentina)– gruiform?
†Teracus littoralis  [leracus Aymard 1856 ; leracus littoralis ] (Early Oligocene of France)
†Teleornis impressus  (Deseado Early Oligocene of Argentina)– anatid?
†Pseudolarus guaraniticus  (Deseado Early Oligocene – Miocene of Argentina) – gruiform?
Neornithes incerta sedis BMNH PAL 4989 (Hampstead Early Oligocene of Isle of Wight, England) – formerly "Ptenornis" and included in Headonornis; anseriform?
†"Anas" creccoides  (Early-mid Oligocene of Belgium) – anseriform?
†"Charadrius" sheppardianus  (Florissant middle Oligocene of Florissant, US) – charadriiform (charadriid?)
†Megagallinula harundinea  (Indricotherium middle Oligocene of Chelkar-Teniz, Kazakhstan)
†"Palaeorallus" alienus  (middle Oligocene of Tatal-Gol, Mongolia)– galliform?
†"Vanellus" selysii  (middle Oligocene of Rupelmonde, Belgium) – charadriiform (charadriid)?
†Anserpica kiliani  (Late Oligocene of France) – gruiform (gruid?) or anseriform (anseranatid?)?
†Gnotornis  (Brule Late Oligocene of Shannon County, US) – gruiform (aramid)?
†G. aramiellus 
†G. roardeola
†G. walkeri
†Guguschia nailiae  (Late Oligocene of Pirəkəşkül, Azerbaijan) – anseriform (anserine)? pelagornithid (same as Caspiodontornis)?
†Tiliornis senex  (Late? Oligocene of Argentina)– phoenicopteriform? A nomen dubium
Neornithes incerta sedis QM F40203 (Late Oligocene of Riversleigh, Australia)– gruiform (rallid)?
†Gaviella pusilla  (Oligocene? of Wyoming, US)– gaviiform? plotopterid?
†"Anas" skalicensis  (Early Miocene of "Skalitz", Czech Republic) - anseriform?
†Chenornis graculoides  (Early Miocene) - Anseriformes (Anatidae) or Pelecaniformes (Phalacrocoracidae)?
†"Propelargus" olseni  (Hawthorne Early Miocene of Tallahassee, US) – ciconiiform?
Neornithes incerta sedis MNHN SA 1259-1263 (Early/Middle Miocene of Sansan, France) – passeriform?
†Anisolornis excavatus  (Santa Cruz Middle Miocene of Karaihen, Argentina) – gruiform, galliform, tinamiform?
†"Ardea" perplexa  (Middle Miocene of Sansan, France) – ardeid? strigiform?
†"Cygnus herrenthalsi"  (Middle Miocene of Belgium)
†"Anas" risgoviensis  (Late Miocene of Bavaria, Germany) – anseriform?
†"Ardea" aureliensis (Late Miocene of France) – ardeid?
†Eoneornis australis  (Miocene of Argentina) – anatid? A nomen dubium
†Eutelornis patagonica  (Miocene of Argentina) – anatid?
†Protibis cnemialis  (Miocene of Argentina) – ciconiiform (threskiornithid)?
†"Limnatornis" paludicola  (Miocene of France) – coliid? phoeniculid?
†"Picus" gaudryi (Miocene of France) – piciform?
†"Ardea" lignitum  (Late Pliocene of Germany) – ardeid? strigid (genus Bubo)?
†Bathoceleus hyphalus  (Pliocene of New Providence, Bahamas) – picid?
†"Homalopus" – piciform? Preoccupied by a subgenus of Cryptocephalus leaf beetles described in 1835.
†"Liptornis hesternus"  [Liptornis cuvierii] – pelecaniform (pelecanid)? A nomen dubium
†Proceriavis martini  – pelagornithid?
†Protopelicanus cuvieri  – pelecaniform (pelecanid)? pelagornithid?
†Eurofluvioviridavis robustipes  (middle Eocene of Messel, Germany)
†Archaeotrogonidae  – basal Cypselomorphae?
†Archaeotrogonidae gen. et sp. indet. (Early Eocene)
†Hassiavis laticauda 
†Archaeotrogon  (Late Eocene/Early Oligocene)
†Cimolopterygidae  – charadriiform?
†Cimolopteryx  (Late Cretaceous)
†C. rara 
†C. maxima 
†Lamarqueavis  (Late Cretaceous)
†L. australis 
†L. minima  [Cimolopteryx minima ]
†L. petra  [Cimolopteryx petra ]
†Cladornithidae Wetmore 1930 [Cladornithes ; Cladornidae ] (pelecaniform?
†Cladornis pachypus  (Deseado Early Oligocene of Patagonia, Argentina)
†Eremopezidae  – pelecaniform? ratite?
†Eremopezus eocaenus  (Late Eocene) - includes Stromeria fajumensis 
†Gracilitarsidae  – close to Sylphornithidae?
Eutreptodactylus itaboraiensis  (Late Paleocene of Brazil) - a nomen dubium
Gracilitarsus mirabilis  (middle Eocene of Messel, Germany)
Halcyornithidae  – psittaciform (= Pseudasturidae?), coraciiform?
†Halcyornis toliapicus  (London Clay Early Eocene of England)
†Cyrilavis  (Green River Early Eocene of C US) - psittaciform (halcyornithid or psittacid)?
†C. olsoni  [Primobucco olsoni ]
†C. colburnorum 
†Juncitarsidae 
†Kashinia magnum  [Tenuicrus ; Tenuicrus magnum ] – phoenicopteriform?
†Juncitarsus  – phoenicopteriform?
Laornithidae  – charadriiform? gruiform? pelagornithid?
Laornis edvardsianus  [Laopteryx (sic) ] (Late Cretaceous?)
†Lonchodytidae 
†Lonchodytes estesi  (Late Cretaceous/?Early Palaeocene) – gaviiform/pelecaniform? procellariiform?
†Palaeospizidae – passeriform? coraciiform? coliiform?
†Palaeospiza bella  (Late Eocene of Florissant Fossil Beds, US)
†Parvicuculidae  – cypselomorph, cuculiform, coraciiform (primobucconid)?
†Parvicuculus minor  (Early Eocene of NW Europe)
†Remiornithidae  (Paleocene of France) – palaeognath?
†Remiornis heberti  [Remiornis minor ]
†Sylphornithidae  – cuculiform? coraciiform? close to Gracilitarsidae?
†Sylphornis bretouensis  (middle Eocene of France)
†Oligosylphe mourerchauvireae  (Borgloon Early Oligocene of Hoogbutsel, Belgium)
†Tytthostonychidae  – procellariiform, pelecaniform?
†Tytthostonyx glauconiticus  (Late Cretaceous/Early Palaeocene)
†Zygodactylidae  [Primoscenidae ]– near passerine
†Eozygodactylus americanus 
†Zygodactylus  (Early Oligocene – Middle? Miocene of C Europe)
†Z. ignotus 
†Z. luberonensis 
†Z. grivensis 
†Primoscens minutus   
†Primozygodactylus 
†P. ballmanni 
†P. danielsi 
†P. major 
†P. eunjooae 
†"Graculavidae"  [Dakotornithidae Erickson 1975; Scaniornithidae; Telmatornithidae Cracraft 1972] – a paraphyletic form taxon, the "transitional shorebirds"
†Limosavis  [Graculavus ] (Late Cretaceous –? Early Palaeocene) – charadriiform?
†L. velox  [Graculavus velox ]
†L. augustus  [Graculavus augustus ]
†Palaeotringa  (Late Cretaceous/Early Palaeocene) – charadriiform?
†Telmatornis priscus  [Telmatornis affinis ; Graculavus pumilis ; Palaeotringa vetus ] (Late Cretaceous?) – charadriiform? gruiform? podicipediform?
†Zhylgaia aestiflua  (Early Paleocene) – presbyornithid?
†Scaniornis lundgreni  (Early/Middle Paleocene) – phoenicopteriform?
†Dakotornis cooperi  (Paleocene of North Dakota, US)
†Placement unresolved
"Graculavidae" gen. et sp. indet. (Gloucester County, US)

Struthioniformes
Ostrich and related ratites.

Struthionidae  [†Struthiolithidae ; †Palaeotididae ] (ostriches)
†Palaeotis weigelti  [Palaeogrus geiseltalensis ; Ornitocnemus geiseltalensis ] (middle Eocene)
†Remiornis heberti 
†Orientornis linxiaensis  [Struthio linxiaensis ]
Prehistoric species of extant genera
Struthio  [†Palaeostruthio ; †Struthiolithus  ootaxa; Struthio (Pachystruthio) ; Megaloscelornis ] (Early Miocene – Recent)

Casuariiformes
Cassowaries, emus and related ratites.

Casuariidae Kaup 1847 [Dromaiidae Huxley 1868; Dramaiinae Gray 1870; Dramiceiidae Richmond 1908; Dramaeidae Newton 1896] (emus and cassowaries)
†Diogenornis fragilis  (Early Eocene) – possible casuariiform
†Emuarius  (emuwaries) (Late Oligocene – Late Miocene)
Prehistoric species of extant genera
Dromaius  [Tachea ; Emou ; Peronista ; Metapteryx ] (emus) (Middle Miocene – Recent)
Casuarius  [Cela ; Cela ; Rhea ; Chelarga ; Oxyporus ; Thrasys ; Cassowara ; Hippalectryo ]

Rheiformes
Rheas and related ratites.

†Opisthodactylidae 
†Opisthodactylus  (Miocene) – rheid?
Rheidae  [Rheinae ] (rheas)
†Heterorhea dabbenei  (Pliocene)
†Hinasuri nehuensis 
Prehistoric species of extant genera
Rhea  [Rhea ; Pterocnemia ; Toujou ; Tujus ]

†Dinornithiformes
Moas.

†Megalapterygidae - (Upland moas)
†Megalapteryx didinus  [Palaeocasuarius ; Dinornis didinus ; Megalapteryx benhami ; Megalapteryx hamiltoni ; Megalapteryx hectori ; Megalapteryx tenuipes ; Anomalopteryx didina ; Palaeocasuarius velox ; Palaeocasuarius elegans ; Palaeocasuarius haasti ]
†Dinornithidae  [Palapteryginae ; Palapterygidae ; Dinornithnideae ] (great moas)
†Dinornis  [Palapteryx ; Megalornis ; Movia ; Moa ; Owenia ; Tylopteryx ]
†Emeidae  [Emeinae ; Anomalopterygidae ; Anomalapteryginae ] (lesser moas)
†Anomalopteryx didiformis  (Little bush moas)
†Emeus crassus  Reichenbach 1853 (Eastern moas)
†Euryapteryx  (Broad-billed or turkey moas)
†Pachyornis  (Stout moas)

Two unnamed Saint Bathans Fauna species.

Apterygiformes

Apterygidae  [Apteryginae ] (Kiwis)
†Proapteryx micromeros

†Lithornithiformes 

†Lithornithidae  (False tinamous)
†Fissuravis weigelti 
†Pseudocrypturus cercanaxius  (Green River Early/middle Eocene of C US)
†Paracathartes howardae 
†Lithornis  [Promusophaga ; Pediorallus ; Parvigyps ] (Paleocene – Early Eocene)

Tinamiformes
Tinamidae  [Crypturidae ; Tinamotidae ; Eudromiidae ; Rhynchotidae ] (tinamous)
†Querandiornis romani  (Ensenada Early/Middle Pleistocene of Argentina)
†Roveretornis 
Tinamidae gen. et sp. indet. MACN-SC Fleagle Collection (Early – Middle Miocene of S Argentina) - at least 2 species
Prehistoric species of extant genera
Eudromia [non Eudromias ; Calodromas  Calodromus ; Calopezus ; Tinamisornis ; Roveretornis ] 
Nothura  [†Cayetanornis ]
Crypturellus  [Microcrypturus ; Crypturornis ; Orthocrypturus ]

Vegaviiformes
†Neogaeornis wetzeli Lambrecht 1929 (Late Cretaceous)
†Polarornis gregorii Chatterjee 2002 (Late Cretaceous)
†Vegavis iaai  (Late Cretaceous)
†Maaqwi cascadensis  (Late Cretaceous)
†Australornis lovei  (Paleocene)

Anseriformes

The group that includes modern ducks and geese.
Basal and unresolved forms
†Anatalavis  [Nettapterornis ] (Late Cretaceous/Early Paleocene– Early Eocene)– anseranatid or basal.
†A. rex  [Telmatornis rex ]
†A. oxfordi  [Nettapterornis oxfordi ]
†Romainvillia stehlini  (Late Eocene/Early Oligocene)– anseranatide or anatide
†Saintandrea chenoides 
†Proherodius oweni  (Early Eocene) – presbyornithid?
†Paranyroca magna  (Early Miocene) – anatide or own family?
†Garganornis ballmanni 
Anhimidae  [Palamedeinae ; Palamedeidae ] (screamers
†Chaunoides antiquus 
†Dromornithidae  – Australian mihirungs or "demon ducks"
†Barawertornis tedfordi  (Late Oligocene – Early Miocene)
†Bullockornis planei  (Demon-Duck of Doom) (Middle Miocene)
†Ilbandornis  (Late Miocene)
†I. woodburnei 
†I. lawsoni 
†Dromornis  (Late Miocene – Pliocene)
†D. australis 
†D. stirtoni  (Stirton's Thunder Birds)
Anseranatidae  (magpie-geese
†Eoanseranas handae  (Hand's Dawn Magpie Goose)
Anseranatidae gen. et sp. nov (Late Oligocene)
†Presbyornithidae  [Telmabatidae ]
†Teviornis gobiensis  (Late Cretaceous)
†Headonornis hantoniensis  [Agnopterus hantoniensis ; Presbyornis hantoniensis ; Ptenornis] – only BMNH PAL 30325 belongs to this bird, may belong to Presbyornis.
†Presbyornis  [Nautilornis ; Coltonia ] (Paleocene– Early Oligocene)
†P. isoni 
†P. mongoliensis 
†P. recurvirostrus  [Coltonia recurvirostra ]
†P. pervetus  [Nautilornis avus ; Nautilornis proavitus ]
†Telmabates 
†T. antiquus 
†T. howardae 
†Wilaru 
†W. tedfordi 
†W. prideauxi 
Anatidae  [Cnemiornithidae ; Cygnidae ; Anseridae ; Cereopsidae ; Fuligulidae ; Merganidae ; Mergidae ; Plectropteridae ; Erismaturidae ; Tadornidae ] (ducks, geese and swans)
†Allgoviachen tortonica  (Late Miocene)
†Annakacygna  (Late Miocene)
†A. hajimei 
†A. yoshiiensis  
†Bonibernicla ponderosa  [Branta woolfendeni Bickart 1990]
†Eonessa anaticula (Middle Eocene)
†Cygnavus (Early Oligocene – Early Miocene)
†C. senckenbergi Lambrecht 1931
†C. formosus Korochkin 1968
†Cygnopterus Lambrecht 1931 (middle Oligocene – Early Miocene)– sometimes included in Cygnavus
†C. neogradiensis Kessler & Hir 2009
†C. affinis (Beneden 1883) Lambrecht 1931 [Sula affinis Beneden 1883; Palaeopapia hamsteadiensis Harrison & Walker 1979b]
†Mionetta Livezey & Martin 1988 (Late Oligocene – Early Miocene)
†M. robusta (Milne-Edwards 1868) Mlíkovský 2002 [Anas robusta Milne-Edwards, 1868; Anserobranta robusta (Milne-Edwards 1868) Cheneval 1987]
†M. arvernensis (Lydekker 1891a) [Aythya arvernensis (Lydekker 1891a) Brodkorb 1964; Fuligula arvernensis Lydekker, 1891a]
†M. blanchardi (Milne-Edwards 1863) Livezey & Martin 1988 [Anas blanchardi Milne-Edwards 1863; Palaeortyx phasianoides Milne-Edwards 1869; Anas macroptera Milne-Edwards 1871 Nomen nudum; Taoperdix phasianoides (Milne-Edwards 1869) Brodkorb 1964; Dendrochen blanchardi (Milne-Edwards 1863) Cheneval 1983b]
†M. consobrina (Milne-Edwards 1867) Livezey & Martin 1988 [Anas consobrina Milne-Edwards 1867; Dendrochen consobrina (Milne-Edwards 1867) Cheneval 1983b]
†M. natator (Milne-Edwards 1867) Livezey & Martin 1988 [Anas natator Milne-Edwards 1867; Querquedula natator (Milne-Edwards 1867) Brodkorb 1962; Dendrochen natator (Milne-Edwards 1867) Cheneval 1983b]
†Notochen bannockburnensis  (Early Miocene)
†Australotadorna alecwilsoni Worthy 2009 (Late Oligocene – Early Miocene)
†Pinpanetta Worthy 2009 (Late Oligocene – Early Miocene)
†P. tedfordi Worthy 2009
†P. vickersrichae Worthy 2009
†P. fromensis Worthy 2009
†Dunstanetta johnstoneorum Worthy et al. 2007 (Johnstone's ducks) (Early/Middle Miocene)
†Manuherikia Worthy et al. 2007 (Early/Middle Miocene)
†M. lacustrina Worthy et al. 2007 (Manuherikia duck)
†M. minuta Worthy et al. 2007 (Minute Manuherikia duck)
†M. douglasi Worthy et al. 2008 (Douglas’ duck)
†Matanas enrighti Worthy et al. 2007 (Enright's ducks) (Early/Middle Miocene)
†Miotadorna Worthy et al. 2007 (Early/Middle Miocene)
†M. sanctibathansi Worthy et al. 2007 (St. Bathans shelducks) (Early/Middle Miocene)
†M. catrionae Tennyson et al. 2022 (Catriona's shelduck) (late Early/early Middle Miocene) (synonym of M. sanctibathansi)
†Megalodytes morejohni Howard 1992 (Middle Miocene)
†Sinanas diatomas Yeh 1980 (Middle Miocene)
†Dendrochen Miller 1944 (Late Miocene)
†D. integra (Miller 1944) Cheneval 1987 [Querquedula integra Miller 1944; Anas integra (Miller 1944); Spatula integra (Miller 1944)]
†D. oligocaena (Tugarinov 1940) [Anas oligocaena Tugarinov 1940]
†D. robusta Miller 1944
†Presbychen abavus Wetmore 1930 (Late Miocene)
†Afrocygnus chauvireae Louchart et al. 2005 (Late Miocene – Early Pliocene)
†Balcanas pliocaenica (Early Pliocene) – may belong in Tadorna
†Wasonaka yepomerae Howard 1966 (Middle Pliocene)
†Paracygnus plattensis Short 1969 (Late Pliocene)
†Anabernicula Ross 1935 (Late Pliocene? – Late Pleistocene)
†A. minuscula (Wetmore 1924) [Branta minuscula Wetmore 1924] (Late Pliocene of Benson, Arizona) 
†A. oregonensis Howard 1964b
†A. gracilenta Ross 1935
†Eremochen russelli Brodkorb 1961 (Pliocene)
†Tirarinetta kanunka Worthy 2008 (Pliocene)
†Brantadorna Howard 1964 (Middle Pleistocene)
†B. downsi Howard 1964
†B. robusta (Short 1970) Livezey 1997 [Anabernicula robusta Short 1970]
†Nannonetta invisitata Campbell 1979 (Late Pleistocene)
†Aldabranas cabri Harrison & Walker 1978 (Late Pleistocene)
†Ankonetta larriestrai Cenizo & Agnolín 2010
†Cayaoa bruneti Tonni 1979
†Chenoanas Zelenkov 2012
†C. asiatica Zelenkov et al. 2018
†C. deserta Zelenkov 2012
†C. sansaniensis (Milne-Edwards 1867) (Middle Miocene of Siberia and Late Miocene of France)
†Helonetta brodkorbi Emslie 1992
†Mioquerquedula minutissima Zelenkov & Kuročkin 2012 [Anas velox Milne-Edwards 1867; Anas meyerii Milne-Edwards, 1868; Nettion velox (Milne-Edwards 1868) Brodkorb 1964; Aythya meyerii (Milne-Edwards 1868) Brodkorb 1964] (Middle – Late? Miocene)
†Proanser major Umanskaya 1979
†Shiriyanetta hasegawai Watanabe & Matsuoka 2015
†Pleistoanser bravardi Agnolín 2006
†Lavadytis pyrenae Stidham & Hilton 2015
†Asiavis phosphatica Nesov 1986
†Nogusunna conflictoides Zelenkov 2011
†Sharganetta mongolica Zelenkov 2011
†Protomelanitta Zelenkov 2011
†P. gracilis Zelenkov 2011
†P. shihuibas (Hou 1985) Zelenkov 2012 [Aythya shihuibas Hou 1985]
†Bambolinetta lignitifila (Portis 1884) Mayr & Pavia 2014 [Anas lignitifila Portis 1884] (Early Pliocene of Monte Bamboli, Italy)
†Heteroanser vicinus (Kuročkin 1976) Zelenkov 2012 [Heterochen vicinus Kuročkin 1976; Anser vicinus (Kuročkin 1976) Mlíkovský & Švec 1986]
Placement unresolved
†"Anas" albae Jánossy 1979 (Late Miocene) – formerly in Mergus
†"Anas" amotape Campbell 1979
†"Anas" eppelsheimensis Lambrecht 1933 (Early Pliocene)
†"Anas" isarensis Lambrecht 1933 (Late Miocene)
†"Anas" luederitzensis (Early Miocene)
†"Anas" sanctaehelenae Campbell 1979
†"Anser" scaldii [Anser scaldii Beneden 1872 nomen nudum; "Anas" scaldii] (Late Miocene)
†"Aythya" chauvirae (Middle Miocene) – 2 species
†"Chenopis" nanus De Vis 1905 (Pleistocene) – at least 2 taxa, may be living species
†"Cygnopterus" alphonsi Cheneval 1984 
†"Oxyura" doksana Mlíkovský 2002 (Early Miocene)
†"cf. Megalodytes" (Middle Miocene)
†Anatidae gen. et sp. indet. MNZ S42797 (Early/Middle Miocene)
†Anatidae gen. et spp. indet. (Middle Miocene)
†Anatidae gen. et spp. indet. (Late Miocene)
Prehistoric species of extant genera
Biziura Stephens 1824
†B. exhumata DeVis 1889
†B. delautouri Forbes 1892 [Biziura lobata delautouri (Forbes 1892)] (New Zealand musk duck) 
Dendrocygna
†D. eversa 
†D. valdipinnis 
†D. soporata  [Anas soporata Kuročkin 1976]
Somateria (middle Oligocene – Recent)
Bucephala
†B. cereti Boeuf & Mourer-Chauviré 1992
Clangula
†C. matraensis Kessler 2009
Aix
†A. praeclara Zelenkov & Kuročkin 2012
Cygnus
†C. mariae Bickart 1990
†C. csakvarensis (Lambrecht 1933) Mlíkovský 1992 [Cygnus csákvárensis Lambrecht 1931a nomen nudum; Cygnanser csakvarensis (Lambrecht 1933) Kretzoi 1957; Olor csakvarensis (Lambrecht 1933) Mlíkovský 1992b] 
†C. liskunae (Kuročkin 1976) [Anser liskunae Kuročkin 1976]
†C. atavus (Fraas 1870) Mlíkovský 1992 [Anas atava Fraas 1870; Anas cygniformis Fraas 1870; Palaelodus steinheimensis Fraas 1870; Anser atavus (Fraas 1870) Lambrecht 1933; Anser cygniformis (Fraas 1870) Lambrecht 1933]
†C. paloregonus Cope 1878 [Anser condoni Schufeldt 1892; Cygnus matthewi Schufeldt 1913]
†C. hibbardi Brodkorb 1958
†C. lacustris (De Vis 1905) [Archaeocygnus lacustris De Vis 1905]
†C. verae Boev 2000
Chloephaga
†C. robusta Tambussi 1998
Histrionicus
†Histrionicus shotwelli (Brodkorb 1961) [Ocyplonessa shotwelli Brodkorb 1961]
Mergus
†M. connectens Jánossy 1972
†M. minor Kessler 2009
†M. miscellus Alvarez & Olson 1978
Anas
†A. elapsa DeVis 1888 [Nettion elapsum (DeVis 1888)] (Chinchilla Late Pleistocene of Condamine River, Australia) ("Nettion")
†A. gracilipes DeVis 1905 [Nettion gracilipes (DeVis 1905)] (Late Pleistocene of Australia) ("Nettion")
†A. moldovica (Late Pliocene of Tchichmiknaia, Moldova?Georgia?)
†A. strenuum (Late Pleistocene of Patteramordu, Australia) ("Nettion")
†A. kisatibiensis [Anser kisatibiensis] (Early Pliocene of Kisatibi, Georgia)
†A. lambrechti (Spillman 1942) [Archeoquerquedula lambrechti Spillman 1942; Archaeoquerquedula (sic) lambrechti Stephens; Querquedula lambrechti (Spillman 1942)](Late? Pleistocene of Santa Elena peninsula, Ecuador)
†A. itchtucknee McCoy 1963 
†A. kurochkini Zelenkov & Panteleyev 2015
†A. pullulans (Brodkorb 1961)
†A. schneideri Emslie 1985
†A. bunkeri (Wetmore 1944) [Nettion bunkeri Wetmore 1944]
†A. greeni (Brodkorb 1964) [Nettion greeni Brodkorb 1964]
†A. ogallalae (Brodkorb 1962) [Nettion ogallalae Brodkorb 1962]
†A. cheuen Agnolín 2006
Anser
†A. arenosus Bickart 1990
†A. arizonae Bickart 1990
†A. azerbaidzhanicus Serebrovsky 1940
†A. devjatkini Kuročkin 1971
†A. djuktaiensis Zelenkov & Kuročkin 2014
†A. eldaricus Burchak-Abramovich & Gadzyev 1978
†A. oeningensis (Meyer 1865) Milne-Edwards 1867b [Anas oeningensis Meyer 1865]
†A. pratensis (Short 1970) [Heterochen pratensis Short 1970]
†A. tchikoicus Kuročkin 1985
†A. thompsoni Martin & Mengel 1980
†A. thraceiensis Burchak-Abramovich & Nikolov 1984
†A. pressa (Brodkorb 1964) [Chen pressa Brodkorb 1964] (Dwarf Snow goose)
†A. udabnensis Burchak-Abramovich  1957
Aythya
†A. chauvirae Cheneval 1987
†A. denesi (Kessler 2013) Zelenkov 2016 [Anas denesi Kessler 2013]
†A. effodiata (DeVis 1905) [Nyroca effodiata DeVis 1905]
†A. magna Kuročkin 1985
†A. molesta (Kuročkin 1985) Zelenkov 1985 [Anas molesta Kuročkin 1985]
†A. reclusa (DeVis 1888) [Nyroca reclusa DeVis 1888]
†A. robusta (DeVis 1888) [Nyroca robusta DeVis 1888]
†A. spatiosa Kuročkin 1976
Branta
†B. dickey Miller 1924
†B. esmeralda Burt 1929
†B. howardae Miller 1930
†B. hypsibata (Cope 1878) [Anser hypsibata Cope 1878] 
†B. propinqua Schufeldt 1892
†B. thessaliensis Boev & Koufos 2006
Oxyura
†O. bessomi Howard 1963
†O. hulberti Emslie 1992
†O. zapatanima Alvarez 1977
Chendytes
†O. milleri Howard 1955 (Early Pleistocene of San Nicolás Island US) 
Lophodytes (Late Pleistocene – Recent)
Neochen
†N. barbadiana Brodkorb 1965
†N. debilis (Ameghino 1891) [Chenalopex debilis Ameghino 1891]
†N. pugil (Winge 1888) [Chenalopex pugil Winge 1888]
Tadorna
†T. minor Kessler & Hir 2012
†T. petrina Kuročkin 1985

Galliformes
The group that includes domestic chickens and their relatives.
Placement unresolved
†Archaealectrornis sibleyi Crowe & Short 1992 (Oligocene) - phasianid?
†Archaeophasianus Lambrecht 1933 (Oligocene? - Late Miocene) - tetraonid or phasianid
†A. mioceanus (Shufeldt 1915) [Phasianus mioceanus Shufeldt 1915]
†A. roberti (Stone 1915) [Phasianus roberti Stone 1915]
†Austinornis lentus (Marsh 1877b) Clarke 2004 [Graculavus lentus Marsh 1877b; Ichthyornis lentus (Marsh 1877b) Marsh 1880; Pedioecetes lentus (Marsh 1877b); Pedioecetes phasianellus (Linnaeus 1758) Shufeldt 1915; Tetrao phasianellus Linnaeus 1758] - (Late Cretaceous) tentatively placed here; 
†Chambiortyx cristata Mourer-Chauviré et al. 2013
†"Cyrtonyx" tedfordi (Miller 1952) (Late Miocene)
†Linquornis gigantis Yeh 1980 (middle Miocene)
†Namaortyx sperrgebietensis Mourer-Chauviré, Pickford & 2011
†Palaealectoris incertus Wetmore 1930 (Early Miocene) - tetraonid?
†Palaeoalectoris songlinensis Hou 1987 (middle Miocene)
†Palaeonossax senectus Wetmore 1956 (Late Oligocene) - cracid?
†Palaeortyx Milne-Edwards 1869 [Palaeoperdix Milne-Edwards 1869; Proalector Brodkorb 1964] (middle Eocene -? Early Pliocene) - phasianid or odontophorid
†P. media Milne-Edwards 1871 (nomen nudum)
†P. volans Göhlich & Pavia 2008
†P. gallica Milne-Edwards 1869 non Lydekker 1891 [Rallus dasypus Milne-Edwards 1892; Quercyrallus dasypus (Milne-Edwards) Lambrecht 1933; Taoperdix gallica (Milne-Edwards) Brodkorb 1964; ?Palaeortyx intermedia Ballmann 1969b; Coturnix gallica (Milne-Edwards) Mlýkovský 2002a]
†P. brevipes Milne-Edwards 1869 emend. Paris 1912 [Palaeortyx ocyptera Milne-Edwards 1892; Palaeortyx grivensis Lydekker 1893 non Ballmann 1969a; Plioperdix grivensis (Lydekker 1893) Brodkorb 1964; Palaeortyx cayluxensis Lydekker 1891 non Milne-Edwards 1892 emend. Gaillard 1908; Taoperdix brevipes (Milne-Edwards 1869) Brodkorb 1964]
†P. prisca (Milne-Edwards 1869) [Alectoris prisca (Milne-Edwards 1869) Mlýkovský 2002a; Palaeoperdix prisca Milne-Edwards 1869 emend. Göhlich & Mourer-Chauviré 2005; Palaeoperdix sansaniensis Milne-Edwards 1869; Palaeocryptonyx grivensis Ennouchi 1930]
†P. phasianoides Milne-Edwards 1869 [Palaeoperdix longipes Milne-Edwards 1869; Palaeortyx longipes (Milne-Edwards 1869) Mlíkovský 2000e; Coturnix longipes (Milne-Edwards 1869) Mlíkovský 2002; Palaeocryptonyx gaillardia Ennouchi 1930; Proalector gaillardia (Ennouchi 1930) Brodkorb 1964; Palaeortyx phasianoides grivensis Ballmann 1969a non Lydekker 1893b; Taoperdix phasianoides (Milne-Edwards 1869) Brodkorb 1964]
†P. joleaudi Ennouchi 1930 [Plioperdix joleaudi (Ennouchi 1930) Brodkorb 1964; Palaeortyx depereti Ennouchi 1930; Plioperdix depereti (Ennouchi 1930) Brodkorb 1964]
†Procrax brevipes Tordoff & Macdonald 1957 (middle Eocene? - Early Oligocene) - cracid? gallinuloidid?
†Shandongornis Yeh 1997 (middle Miocene)
†S. shanwanensis Yeh 1997
†S. yinansis Hou 2003
†Sobniogallus albinojamrozi  Tomek et al. 2014
†Taoperdix Milne-Edwards 1869 (Late Oligocene) - gallinuloidid?
†T. pesseiti (Gervais 1862) [Tetrao pessieti Gervais 1862]
†T. miocaena (Gaillard 1939) Ballmann 1969 [Palaeortyx miocaena Gaillard 1939]
Galliformes gen. et sp. indet. MCZ 342506 (Oligocene) - formerly in Gallinuloides; phasianid?
†Gallinuloididae Lucas 1900 
†Gallinuloides wyomingensis Eastman 1900 (Early/middle Eocene)
†Paraortygoides Mayr 2000 (London Clay Early Eocene of Walton-on-the-Naze, England – middle Eocene of Messel, Germany)
†P. messelensis Mayr 2000
†P. radagasti Dyke & Gulas 2002
†Paraortygidae Mourer-Chauviré 1992 
†Pirortyx major (Gaillard 1939) Brodkorb 1964 [Palaeortyx major Gaillard 1939]
†Scopelortyx klinghardtensis Mourer-Chauviré, Pickford & Senut 2015
†Paraortyx Gaillard 1908 sensu Brodkorb 1964
†P. lorteti Gaillard 1908 [Palaeortyx cayluxensis Lydekker 1891; Palaeortyx gaillardi Lambrecht 1933; Ludiortyx gaillardi (Lambrecht 1933) Brodkorb 1964]
†P. brancoi Gaillard 1908
†Quercymegapodiidae Mourer-Chauviré 1992 
†Taubacrex granivora dAlvarenga 1988 (Late Oligocene/Early Miocene of Brazil)
†Ameripodius Alvarenga 1995 (Late Oligocene – Early Miocene of Brazil and France)
†A. silvasantosi Alvarenga 1995
†A. alexis Mourer-Chauviré 2000
†Quercymegapodius Mourer-Chauviré 1992 (middle Eocene – Early Oligocene)
†Q. depereti (Gaillard 1908) [Palaeocryptonyx depereti Gaillard 1908]
†Q. brodkorbi Mourer-Chauviré 1992
Megapodidae – megapodes
†Ngawupodius minya Boles & Ivison 1999
Prehistoric species of extant genera
†Leipoa gallinacea – formerly Chosornis, Palaeopelargus, Progura
Cracidae – guans and curassows
†Boreortalis laesslei Brodkorb 1954 (Early Miocene) – may be same as Ortalis
Extant genera present in the fossil record
Ortalis (Early Miocene – Recent)
†O. affinis Feduccia & Wilson 1967
†O. phengites Wetmore 1923
†O. pollicaris Miller 1944
†O. tantala Wetmore 1933
Odontophoridae – New World quails
†Nanortyx inexpectatus Weigel 1963 (Cypress Hills Early Oligocene of North Calf Creek, Canada)
†Neortyx peninsularis Holman 1961 (Early Pleistocene of Reddick, US)
†Miortyx Miller 1944 (Rosebud Early Miocene of Flint Hill, US)
†M. teres Miller 1944
†M. aldeni Howard 1966
Placement unresolved
Odontophoridae gen. et sp. indet. KUVP 9393 (White River Early/middle Oligocene of Logan County, US)
Prehistoric species of extant genera
†Cyrtonyx cooki Gutierrez et al. 1981 (Late Miocene? of Upper Sheep Creek, US)
†Callipepla shotwelli (Brodkorb 1958) [Lophortyx shotwelli Brodkorb 1958] (Middle Pliocene of McKay Reservoir, US) 
†Colinus hibbardi Wetmore 1944 (Rexroad Late Pliocene of Rexroad, US)
†Colinus suilium Brodkorb 1959 (Early Pleistocene of SE US)
†Colinus sp. (Late Pliocene of Benson, US)
†Dendrortyx? sp. (Late Pleistocene of San Josecito Cavern, Mexico)
Phasianidae – pheasants, quails, partridges, grouse and turkeys
†Bantamyx georgicus Kuročkin 1982
†Centuriavis lioae Ksepka et al., 2022
†Diangallus mious Hou 1985
†Lophogallus naranbulakensis Zelenkov & Kuročkin 2010
†Megalocoturnix cordoni Sánchez Marco 2009 (Early Pliocene of Layna, Spain)
†Miophasianus Brodkorb 1952 [Miophasianus Lambrecht 1933 nomen nudum; Miogallus Lambrecht 1933] 
†M. maxima (Lydekker 1893) Brodkorb 1964 [Palaeortyx maxima Lydekker 1893]
†M. altus (Milne-Edwards 1869) Villalta & Crusafont 1950 [Phasianus altus Milne-Edwards 1869; Miogallus altus (Milne-Edwards 1869) Mlíkovský 2002; Phasianus Desnoyersii Milne-Edwards 1869; Ardea similis Fraas 1870; Tantalus milne-edwardsii Shufeldt 1896; Pseudotantalus Milne-Edwardsi (Shufeldt 1896) Sharpe; Gallus longaevus Ammon 1918; Phasianus augustus Ammon 1918; Botaurites similis (Fraas 1870) Lambrecht 1933; Miophasianus augustus (Ammon 1918) Lambrecht 1933; Miophasianus desnoyersii (Milne-Edwards 1869) Lambrecht 1933; Miogallus longaevus (Ammon 1918) Lambrecht 1933; Proardea similis (Ammon 1870) Gaillard 1939; Ibis milne-edwardsi (Shufeldt 1896) Brodkorb 1963c]
†M. medius (Milne-Edwards 1869) Lambrecht 1933 [Phasianus medius Milne-Edwards 1869; Palaeoperdix medius (Milne-Edwards 1869) Cheneval 2000]
†Proagriocharis kimballensis Martin & Tate 1970 (Kimball Late Miocene/Early Pliocene of Lime Creek, US)
†Palaeocryptonyx Depéret 1892 [Chauvireria Boev 1997; Pliogallus Tugarinov 1940b non Gaillard 1939; Lambrechtia Janossy 1974] (Late Pliocene of SW Europe) 
†P. donnezani Depéret 1892 [Francolinus Čapeki Lambrecht 1933; Pliogallus coturnoides Tugarinov 1940b; Plioperdix coturnoides (Tugarinov 1940b) Kretzoi 1955b; Francolinus capeki wenzensis Jánossy 1974a; Francolinus capeki villányiensis Jánossy 1974a; Francolinus (Lambrechtia) capeki (Lambrecht 1933) Jánossy 1974a; Alectoris baryosefi Tchernov 1980; Francolinus wezensis (Jánossy 1974a) Jánossy 1981; Plioperdix capeki (Lambrecht 1933) Mlíkovský 1995b; Alectoris donnezani (Depéret 1892) Mlíkovský 2002; Chauvireria balcanica Boev 1997a]
†P. grivensis Ennouchi 1930
†P. novaki Sánchez Marco 2009
†P. edwardsi (Depéret 1887) Ballmann 1969a [Palaeortyx edwardsi Depéret 1887; Palaeortyx miocaena Gaillard 1939; Taoperdix miocaena (Gaillard 1939) Ballmann 1969; Palaeoperdix edwardsi (Depéret 1887) Brodkorb 1964; Alectoris edwardsi (Depéret 1887) Mlíkovský 2002]
†P. minor (Jánossy 1974) [Francolinus minor Jánossy 1974; Ammoperdix ponticus Tugarinov 1940b; Pliogallus ponticus (Tugarinov 1940); Plioperdix ponticus (Tugarinov 1940) Kuročkin 1985; Francolinus (Lambrechtia) minor Jánossy 1974a]
†P. subfrancolinus (Jánossy 1976b) [Francolinus subfrancolinus Jánossy 1976b; Plioperdix subfrancolinus (Jánossy 1976b) Mlíkovský 1995b]
†Pliogallus Běljajeva 1948
†P. coturnoides Běljajeva 1948
†P. csarnotanus Kessler & Horváth 2022
†Plioperdix Kretzoi 1955 [Pliogallus Gaillard 1939 non Tugarinov 1940]
†P. crassipes (Gaillard 1939) [Pliogallus crassipes Gaillard 1939]
†P. kormosi (Gaillard 1939) [Pliogallus kormosi Gaillard 1939]
†P. africana Mourer-Chauviré & Geraads 2010
†P. hungarica (Jánossy 1991) Zelenkov & Panteleyev 2014 [Palaeocryptonyx hungaricus Jánossy 1991]
†Rustaviornis georgicus Burchak-Abramovich & Meladze 1972
†Rhegminornis calobates Wetmore 1943 (Early Miocene of Bell, US)
†Schaubortyx keltica (Eastman 1905) Brodkorb 1964 [Taoperdix keltica Eastman 1905] (middle Eocene – Early Oligocene)
†Shandongornis Yeh 1997
†S. shanwanensis Yeh 1997
†S. yinansis Hou 2003
†Shanxiornis fenyinis Wang et al. 2006
†Tologuica Zelenkov & Kuročkin 2009 (Middle Miocene of Sharga, Mongolia)
†T. aurorae Zelenkov & Kuročkin 2009
†T. karhui Zelenkov & Kuročkin 2009
Placement unresolved
Tetraoninae gen. et sp. indet. (Sajóvölgyi Middle Miocene of Mátraszõlõs, Hungary)
Meleagridae gen. et sp. indet. (Late Miocene of Westmoreland County, US)
"Tympanchus" stirtoni Miller 1944 (Early Miocene of South Dakota)
"Tympanuchus" lulli Shuefeldt 1915 (Pleistocene? of New Jersey)
Extant genera present in the fossil record
Coturnix (Late Oligocene – Recent)
Bambusicola (Late Miocene – Recent)
†B. dalianensis (Hou 1990) [Tetrastes dalianensis Hou 1990]
†B. nini Sánchez Marco 2009
†B. praebonasia (Jánossy 1974) Bocheński 1991 [Tetrastes praebonasia Jánossy 1974]
Phasianus (Late Miocene)
†P. lufengia Hou 1985
†P. yanshansis Huang & Hou 1984
Crossoptilon
†C. jiai Hou 1982
Lophura
†L. wayrei Harrison & Walker 1982
Gallus (Late Miocene/Early Pliocene – Recent)
†G. aesculapii Jánossy 1976
†G. beremendensis Jánossy 1977
†G. georgicus
†G. imereticus 
†G. karabachensis Baryšnikov & Potapova 1995 (Giant junglefowl)
†G. kudarensis Burčak-Abramovič & Potapova
†G. meschtscheriensis
†G. tamanensis
Lagopus (Early? Pliocene – Recent)
†L. atavus Jánossy 1974
†L. balcanicus Boev 1995
†L. lagopus noaillensis Mourer-Chauviré 1975
†L. muta correzensis Mourer-Chauviré 1975
Meleagris (Early Pliocene – Recent)
†M. celer Marsh 1872
†M. tridens Wetmore 1931
†M. progenes (Brodkorb 1964) [Agriocharis progenes Brodkorb 1964]
†M. leopoldi
†M. anza (Howard 1963) [Agriocharis anza Howard 1963]
†M. crassipes Rea 1980
Pavo (Early Pliocene – Recent)
†P. bravardi (Gervais 1849) [Gallus moldovicus Abramovich, Ganea & Shushpanov 1993]
Tetrao (Early Pliocene – Recent)
†T. conjugens Jánossy 1974
†T. macropus Jánossy 1976
†T. partium (Kretzoi 1962)
†T. praeurogallus Jánossy 1969
†T. rhodopensis Boev 1998
Lyrurus
†Lyrurus tetrix longipes
Francolinus (Late Pliocene – Recent)
†F. capeki Jánossy 1974
†F. villanyiensis Jánossy 1974
†F. wenzensis Jánossy 1974
Perdix (Early Pleistocene – Recent)
†P. inferna (Kurochkin 1985) [Lophura inferna Kuročkin 1985]
†P. margaritae Kuročkin 1985
†P. palaeoperdix Mourer-Chauviré 1975
Syrmaticus
†S. kozlovae Kuročkin 1985 
Bonasa (Early/Middle Pleistocene – Recent)
†B. dalianensis (Hou 1990) [Tetrastes dalianensis Hou 1990]
†B. nini Sánchez Marco 2009
†B. praebonasia (Jánossy 1974) Bocheński 1991 [Tetrastes praebonasia Jánossy 1974]
Dendragapus (Late Pleistocene – Recent)
†D. gilli (Brodkorb 1964) [Palaeotetrix gilli Brodkorb 1964]
†D. lucasi Jehl 1969
Alectoris
†A. baryosefi Tchernov 1980
†A. bavarica Ballmann 1969
†A. peii Hou 1982

Charadriiformes
Gulls, auks, shorebirds
Basal and unresolved taxa
Charadriiformes gen. et sp. indet. (Late Cretaceous) – burhinid? basal?
"Morsoravis" (Late Paleocene/Early Eocene) – a nomen nudum?
Jiliniornis (middle Eocene) – charadriid?
Boutersema (Early Oligocene) – glareolid?
Turnipax (Early Oligocene) – turnicid?
Elorius (Early Miocene)
"Larus desnoyersii (Early Miocene of SE France) – larid? stercorarid?
"Larus pristinus (John Day Early Miocene of Willow Creek, US) – larid?
Charadriiformes gen. et spp. indet. (Early/Middle Miocene) – several species, 1 probably larid
Charadriiformes gen. et sp. indet. (Middle Miocene)
"Totanus" teruelensis (Late Miocene of Los Mansuetos, Spain) – scolopacid? larid?
"Actitis" balcanica (Late Pliocene of Varshets, Bulgaria) – scolopacid? charadriid?
Scolopacidae – waders and snipes
Paractitis (Early Oligocene)
Mirolia (Middle Miocene)
Placement unresolved
Scolopacidae gen. et sp. indet. (Middle – Late Miocene)
Scolopacidae gen. et sp. indet. (Early Pliocene)
Extant genera present in the fossil record
Limosa (Late Eocene? – Recent)
Tringa (Late Eocene/Early Oligocene? – Recent) – includes Totanus
Gallinago (Late Miocene/Early Pliocene – Recent)
Scolopax (Early/Middle Pliocene? – Recent)
Phalaropus (Middle Pliocene – Recent)
Actitis (Late Pliocene – Recent)
Numenius (Late Pleistocene – Recent) – includes Palnumenius
Jacanidae – jacanas
Nupharanassa (Early Oligocene)
Janipes
Prehistoric species of extant genera
Jacana farrandi
Laridae – gulls
Laridae gen. et sp. indet. (Early Oligocene)
Laricola (Late Oligocene/Early Miocene) – larid? Formerly "Larus" elegans and "L." totanoides
Gaviota  (Middle/Late Miocene)
Extant genera present in the fossil record
Larus (Middle Miocene – Recent)
Alcidae – auks
Hydrotherikornis (Late Eocene)
Pseudocepphus (Middle – Late Miocene)
Petralca (Early –? Late Oligocene)
Miocepphus (Middle Miocene)
Alcodes (Late Miocene)
Praemancalla (Late Miocene – Early Pliocene)
Mancalla (Late Miocene – Early Pleistocene)
Extant genera present in the fossil record
Cepphus (Late Miocene – Recent)
Cerorhinca (Late Miocene – Recent)
Uria (Late Miocene – Recent)
Aethia  (Late Miocene – Recent)
Alca (Late Miocene/Early Pliocene – Recent)
Synthliboramphus (Late Miocene/Early Pliocene – Recent)
Fratercula (Early Pliocene – Recent)
Pinguinus (Early Pliocene – Recent)
Brachyramphus (Late Pliocene – Recent)
Ptychoramphus (Late Pliocene – Recent)
Stercorariidae – skuas and jaegers
Prehistoric species of extant genera
Stercorarius sp. (Middle Miocene)
Stercorarius shufeldti (Fossil Lake Middle Pleistocene of WC US)
Prehistoric subspecies of extant species
Stercorarius pomarinus philippi
Glareolidae – pratincoles
Paractiornis (Agate Fossil Beds Early Miocene of Sioux County, US)
Mioglareola (Early Miocene of Czech Republic) - formerly "Larus" dolnicensis
Prehistoric species of extant genera
Glareola neogena
Burhinidae – thick-knees
Prehistoric species of extant genera
Burhinus lucorum (Early Miocene)
Burhinus aquilonaris
Burhinus sp. (Cuba, West Indies)
Burhinus sp. (Late Pleistocene of Las Higueruelas, Spain)
Prehistoric subspecies of extant species
Burhinus bistriatus nanus (Bahamas, West Indies)
Charadriidae – plovers
Limicolavis (John Day Early Miocene of Malheur County, US)
Viator (Late Pleistocene of Talara, Peru) – may be synonym of Vanellus (or Belanopteryx if valid)
Extant genera present in the fossil record
Vanellus (Middle/Late Pleistocene – Recent) – includes Belanopteryx
Additional prehistoric species of extant genera
Oreopholus orcesi
Recurvirostridae – avocets
Extant genera present in the fossil record
Himantopus (Late Miocene – Recent)
Additional prehistoric species of extant genera
Recurvirostra sanctaeneboulae

†Gastornithiformes (extinct)

The diatrymas, a group of huge flightless Paleogene birds of unclear affinities. Traditionally placed within the Gruiformes, they are usually considered a distinct order nowadays and appear closer to the Anseriformes.
Gastornithidae
†Ornitholithes biroi Dughi & Sirugue 1969 [ootaxa- Gastornis?]
†Ornithoformipes controversus [ichnotaxa]
†Rivavipes giantess [ichnotaxa]
†Gasthornithidae gen. et sp. indet. (Paleocene) – possibly Gastornis
†Gasthornithidae gen. et sp. indet. YPM PU 13258 (Early Eocene) – possibly juvenile Gastornis giganteus
†"Diatryma" cotei Galliard 1936 (middle-Late Eocene)
†Gastornis Hébert 1855 [Diatryma Cope 1876; Barornis Marsh 1894; Omorhamphus Sinclair 1928; Palaeornis Bonaparte 1856; Macrornis Seeley 1866; Zhongyuanus Hou 1980] (Late Paleocene – middle Eocene)
†G. parisiensis Hébert 1855 [Gastornis edwardsii Lemoine 1878; Gastornis klaasseni Newton 1885]
†G. giganteus (Cope 1876) [Diatryma gigantea Cope 1876; Barornis regens Marsh 1894; Diatryma regens (Marsh 1894); Omorhamphus storchii Sinclair 1928 (juvenile); Diatryma steini Matthew & Granger 1917; Diatryma ajax Shufeldt 1913; Gastornis ajax (Shufeldt 1913) Brodkorb 1967]
†G. sarasini (Schaub 1929) Mlíkovský 2002 [Diatryma sarasini Schaub, 1929b; Diatryma geiselensis Fischer 1978; Gastornis geiselensis (Fischer 1978)]
†G. russeli Martin 1992
†G. xichuanensis (Hou 1980) Buffetaut 2013 [Zhongyuanus xichuanensis Hou 1980]

Gruiformes
The group that includes modern rails and cranes. Probably paraphyletic.
Placement unresolved
†Rupelrallus  (Early Oligocene)– rallid? parvigruid?
†R. belgicus 
†R. saxoniensis 
†"Gruiformes" gen. et sp. indet. MNZ S42623 (Early/Middle Miocene)– Aptornithidae?
†Songziidae  possibly a nomen nudum
†Songzia (Eocene) possibly a nomen nudum
†S. heidangkouensis 
†S. acutunguis 
†Eogruidae 

†Sonogrus gregalis  (Ergilin Dzo Late Eocene/Early Oligocene of Khor Dzan, Mongolia)
†Eogrus  [Progrus ] (Irdin Manha Middle/Late Eocene – Tung Gur Late Miocene/Early Pliocene of Mongolia)
†E. aeola 
†E. crudus 
†E. turanicus  [Progrus turanicus ]
†E. wetmorei 
†Ergilornithinae
†Proergilornis minor  (Early/middle Oligocene of Ergil-Obo, Mongolia)
†Ergilornis (Early/middle Oligocene of Ergil-Obo, Mongolia)
†E. rapidus
†E. minor
†Amphipelargus  [Urmiornis ]
†A. brodkorbi  [Urmiornis brodkorbi ]
†A. majori  [Amphipelargus maraghanus ; Urmiornis maraghanus ] [treated as ciconiid by Louchart et al. 2005]
†A. dzabghanensis 
†A. cracrafti  [Urmiornis cracrafti ]
†A. ukrainus  [Urmiornis ukrainus ]
†A. orientalis  [Urmiornis orientalis ]
†Geranoididae  
†Eogeranoides campivagus  (Willwood Early Eocene of Foster Gulch, US)
†Geranoides jepseni  (Willwood Early Eocene of South Elk Creek, US)
†Geranodornis aenigma  (Bridger middle Eocene of Church Buttes, US)
†Galligeranoides boriensis 
†Palaeophasianus  (Willwood Early Eocene of Bighorn County, US)
†P. meleagroides 
†P. incompletus 
†Paragrus  (Early Eocene of WC US)
†P. prentici  [Gallinuloides prentici ; Grus prentici ]
†P. shufeldti 
†Parvigruidae Mayr 2005
†Parvigrus pohli  (Early Oligocene of Pichovet, France)
Aramidae 
†Badistornis aramus  (middle Oligocene)– aramid?
Extant genera present in the fossil record
Aramus paludigrus  (Middle Miocene of La Venta, Colombia)- Aramid
Gruidae – cranes
†Camusia quintanai  (Late Miocene of Menorca, Mediterranean)
†Aramornis  (Middle Miocene) – gruid? aramid?
†A. longurio 
†A. robalearica
†A. crataegensis
†Palaeogrus  (middle Eocene of Germany and Italy – Middle Miocene of France)
†P. princeps  [Ornitocnemus robustus ; Grus princeps ]
†P. hordwelliensis  [Grus hordwellianus ; Ornitocnemus hordwelliensis ]
†P. mainburgensis 
†Geranopsis hastingsiae  Hordwell Late Eocene– Early Oligocene of England)– gruiform (gruid?) or anseriform (anseranatid?)?
†Eobalearica tugarinovi  (Ferghana Late? Eocene of Ferghana, Uzbekistan) 
†Pliogrus (Early Pliocene of Eppelsheim, Germany)
†Probalearica mongolica  (Late Oligocene? – Middle Pliocene) gruid? A nomen dubium?
Gruidae gen. et sp. indet. – formerly Grus conferta  (Late Miocene/Early Pliocene of Contra Costa County, US)
Extant genera present in the fossil record
Balearica (Early Miocene – Recent)
†B. crataegensis  [Probalearica crataegensis ]
†B. excelsa  [Palaeogrus excelsa ; Grus excelsa ; Ornitocnemus excelsus ]
†B. exigua 
†B. rummeli  [Basityto rummeli ] (giant barn-owl)
Grus (Middle/Late Miocene – Recent)
†G. bogatshevi
†G. haydeni 
†G. latipes [Baeopteryx latipes]
†G. moldavica  [Probalearica moldavica ]
†G. nannodes 
†G. pagei 
†G. pentelici  [Pliogrus pentelici ; G. afghana ]
†G. primigenia 
†G. melitensis  (Maltese crane)
Rallidae – rails
†Aletornis  [Protogrus ] (middle Eocene)
†A. marshi  [Grus marshi ; Protogrus marshi ]
†A. bellus 
†A. gracilis 
†A. nobilis  [Grus nobilis ; Protogrus nobilis ]
†A. pernix 
†Australlus 
†A. disneyi  [Gallinula disneyi ]
†A. gagensis 
†Baselrallus intermedius 
†Belgirallus  (Early Oligocene)
†B. minutus 
†B. oligocaenus 
†Creccoides osbornii  (Late Pliocene/Early Pleistocene)
†Eocrex  (Early Eocene)
†E. primus 
†E. tagusevae 
†Euryonotus  (Pleistocene)– rallid?
†E. uspallatensis 
†E. brachypterus 
†E. argentinus 
†Fulicaletornis venustus  [Aletornis venustus ] (middle Eocene)
†Ibidopsis hordwelliensis  (Late Eocene)
†Latipons  (middle Eocene)
†L. gardneri 
†L. robinsoni 
†Miofulica dejardini  [Fulica dejardinii ] (Middle Miocene)
†Miorallus major  [Rallus major ] (Middle – Late Miocene)
†Palaeoaramides  [Pararallus ; Tertiariaporphyrula ] (Late Oligocene/Early Miocene – Late Miocene)
†P. lungi  [Tertiariaporphyrula lungi ; Mioporphyrula lungi ]
†P. minutus 
†P. tugarinovi  [Tertiariaporphyrula tugarinovi ]
†P. christyi  [Rallus christyi ; Rallus eximius ; Palaeoaramides eximius ]
†P. minor [Rallus minor]
†P. beaumontii  [Rallus beaumontii ; Pararallus beaumontii ; Tertiariaporphyrula beaumonti ; Rallus dispar ; Pararallus dispar ; Palaeoaramides dispar ]
†Palaeorallus Wetmore 1931 (Early Eocene)
†P. troxelli 
†P. brodkorbi 
†Paraortygometra porzanoides  [Microrallus ; Rallus porzanoides ; Microrallus fejfari ] (Late Oligocene/?Early Miocene –? Middle Miocene)
†Parvirallus  (Early – middle Eocene)
†P. gracilis 
†P. bassetti 
†P. gassoni 
†P. medius 
†Pastushkinia zazhigini  [Crex zazhigini ]
†Pleistorallus flemingi  (Fleming's rails)
†Quercyrallus (Late Eocene –? Late Oligocene)
†Q. ludianus  [Quercyrallus intermedius ; Rallus adelus ; Ludiortyx adelus ]
†Q. arenarius  [Rallus arenarius ]
†Q. quercy 
†Rallicrex (Middle/Late Oligocene)
†R. litkensis 
†R. polgardiensis 
†R. kolozsvarensis 
†Rhenanorallus rhenanus 
†Wanshuina lii 
†Youngornis (Middle Miocene)
†Y. gracilis 
†Y. qiluensis 
Placement unresolved
Rallidae gen. et sp. indet. (Late Oligocene)
Rallidae gen. et spp. indet. (Early/Middle Miocene)– several species
Rallidae gen. et sp. indet. (Middle Miocene)
Rallidae gen. et sp. indet. (Late Miocene)
Rallidae gen. et sp. indet. UMMP V55013/-14; UMMP V55012/V45750/V45746 (Late Pliocene)
Rallidae gen. et sp. indet. UMMP V29080 (Late Pliocene)
Rallidae gen. et sp. indet. (Bermuda, West Atlantic)
Extant genera present in the fossil record
Rallus [†Epirallus ] (Middle Miocene – Recent)
†R. auffenbergi  [Porzana auffenbergi ]
†R. cyanocavi 
†R. ibycus 
†R. lacustris 
†R. minutus 
†R. natator  [Epirallus natator ]
†R. phillipsi 
†R. prenticei 
†R. recessus 
†R. richmondi  [Rallus dubius ]
Porzana (Middle? Miocene – Recent)
†P. botunensis 
†P. estramosi 
†P. kretzoii 
†P. matraensis 
†P. piercei 
†P. risillus  [Rallus risillus ]
Gallinula (Late Oligocene – Recent)
†G. balcanica 
†G. brodkorbi 
†G. gigantea 
†G. kansarum  [Fulica americana (in partim)]
Fulica (Early Pliocene – Recent)
†F. infelix 
†F. podagrica 
†F. stekelesi 
Laterallus
†L. guti 
†L. insignis  (Rexroad Late Pliocene of Rexroad, US)
†L. sp. (Late Pliocene of Macasphalt Shell Pit, US)
Coturnicops
†C. avita  (Glenns Ferry Late Pliocene of Hagerman, US)
Porphyrio
†P. parvus

Eurypygiformes
†Aptornithidae 
†Aptornis proasciarostratus 
Eurypygidae 
†Eoeurypyga olsoni 
†Messelornithidae  – Messel-birds
†Pellornis mikkelseni 
†Itardiornis hessae 
†Messelornis 
†M. russelli  ["Messelornis" russelli sensu Mayr 2007]
†M. nearctica 
†M. cristata

Cariamiformes
†Itaboravis elaphrocnemoides 
†Walbeckornis creber 
†Qianshanornithidae 
†Qianshanornis rapax 
†Salmilidae   
†Salmila robusta 
†Ameghinornithidae 
†Strigogyps  [Aenigmavis ; Ameghinornis ; Eocathartes ; Geiseloceros ]
†S. dubius 
†S. robustus  [Eocathartes robustus ; Geiseloceros robustus ] (middle Eocene of Germany)
†S. sapea  [Aenigmavis sapea ; Ameghinornis minor ]

†Bathornithidae  
†Eutreptornis uintae  (Uinta Late Eocene of Ouray Agency, US)
†Neocathartes grallator  [Eocathartes ; Eocathartes grallator ; Bathornis grallator ] (Late Eocene)
†Paracrax  (Early/middle Oligocene of Gerry's Ranch, US – Brule Late Oligocene of South Dakota, US)
†P. antiqua  [Meleagris antiquus ; Oligocorax mediterraneus ; Phalacrocorax mediterraneus ]
†P. wetmorei 
†P. gigantea 
†Bathornithidae gen. nov. (Early – middle Oligocene of C US) – formerly Bathornis celeripes  and B. cursor  
†Bathornis  (Early Oligocene – Early Miocene of C US)
†B. minor 
†B. veredus  [Palaeogyps prodromus ] (Early Oligocene of WC North America)
†B. fax   [Palaeocrex fax Wetmore 1927]
†B. geographicus 
†B. fricki  

†Idiornithidae  [Orthocnemidae]
†Dynamopterus  [Idiornis ; Orthocnemus ] (middle Eocene of Messel, Germany –? Quercy Phosphorites middle Oligocene of Quercy, France)
†I. cursor  [Orthocnemus cursor ; Orthocnemus major ; Idiornis major ]
†I. gallicus  [Filholornis gravis ; Orthocnemus gallicus ; Agnopterus gallicus ]
†I. gracilis  [Elaphrocnemus gracilis ; Agnopterus gracilis ]
†I. minor  [Orthocnemus minor ; Agnopterus minor ]
†D. anthracinus  [Idiornis anthracinus ]
†D. tuberculata  [Idiornis tuberculata ]
†D. gaillardi  [Idiornis gaillardi ]
†D. itardiensis  [Idiornis itardiensis ; Agnopterus itardiensis ]
†Talantatos  [Elaphrocnemus ; Filholornis ] (Late Eocene/Early Oligocene of France)
†T. bordkorbi  [Elaphrocnemus bordkorbi ]
†T. crex  [Elaphrocnemus crex ] 
†T. phasianus  [Elaphrocnemus phasianus ; Filholornis debilis ; Filholornis paradoxa ]
†T. fossilis  [Tantalus fossilis ; Orthocnemus major ; Idiornis major ; Telecrex peregrinus ]
†T. proudlocki  [Percolinus proudlocki ]
†Gypsornis  [Percolinus ] (Montmartre Late Eocene of Montmartre, France)
†G. cuvieri 
†G. venablesi  [Percolinus venablesi ]
†Propelargus  [Oblitavis ] (Late Eocene/Early Oligocene)
†P. edwardsi
†P. insolitus  [Oblitavis insolitus ]
†P. cayluxensis 
†Occitaniavis elatus  [Geranopsis ; Geranopsis elatus ; Propelargus elatus ]
†Ibidopodia  (Late Oligocene/Early Miocene of France) – threskiornithid? 
†I. chavrochensis 
†I. minuta 
†I. palustris 
†Phorusrhacidae  – Terror birds
†Lavocatavis africana 
†Patagorhacos terrificus 
†Eleutherornis  (Late Eocene)
†E. helveticus 
†E. cotei 
†Paleopsilopterus itaboraiensis  (Middle Paleocene)
†Procariama simplex  (Late Miocene – Early Pliocene)
†Psilopterus  [Pelecyornis ; Staphylornis ] (middle Oligocene – Late Miocene)
†P. bachmanni  [Patagornis bachmanni ; Psilopterus communis ; Psilopterus intermedius ; Phororhacos delicatus ; Pelecyornis puerredonensis ]
†P. lemoinei  [Patagornis lemoinei ; Psilopterus australis ; Pelecyornis tubulatus ; Phorohacos modicus ; Staphylornis gallardoi ; Staphylornis erythacus ; Pelecyornis tenuirostris ]
†P. affinis  [Phororhacos affinis ]
†P. colzecus 
†Llallawavis scagliai 
†Mesembriornis  [Paleociconia ; Prophorohacos ; Hermosiornis ] (Late Miocene – Late Pliocene)
†M. milneedwardsi  [Paleociconia australis ; Driornis pampeanus ; Hermosiornis milneedwardsi ; Hermosiornis rapax ; Prophororhacos australis ]
†M. incertus  [Prophororhacos incertus ]
†Patagornis marshi  [Morenomercatia ; Tolmodus ; Tolmodus inflatus ; Phorusrhacos inflatus ; Paleociconia cristata ; Morenomerceraria cristata ] (Early – Middle Miocene)
†Andrewsornis abbotti  (middle – Late Oligocene)
†Andalgalornis steulleti  [Phororhacos steulleti Kraglijevič 1931; Phororhacos deautieri ; Andalgalornis ferox ] (Late Miocene – Early Pliocene)
†Phorusrhacos longissimus  [Stereornis ; Darwinornis ; Owenornis ; Titanornis ; Callornis  Calornis ; Eucallornis ; Liornis ; Phororhacos longissimus ; Phororhacos platygnathus ; Phororhacos sehuensis ; Stereornis rollieri ; Stereornis gaundryi ; Mesembriornis studeri ; Mesembriornis quatrefragesi ; Darwinornis copei ; Darwinornis zittelli ; Darwinornis socialis ; Owenornis affinis ; Owenornis lydekkeri ; Titanornis mirabilis ; Callornis giganteus ; Eucallornis giganteus ; Liornis floweri ; Liornis minor ] (Early – Middle Miocene)
†Devincenzia pozzi  [Onactornis Cabrera 1939; Phorohacos pozzi ; Phorohacos longissimus mendocinus ; Devincenzia gallinali ; Onactornis depressus ; Onactornis pozzi ; Onactornis mendocinus ] (Late Miocene – Early Pliocene)
†Titanis walleri  (Early – Late Pliocene)
†Kelenken guillermoi  (Early – Late Pliocene)
†Physornis fortis  [Aucornis ; Aucornis euryrhynchus ] (middle – Late Oligocene)
†Paraphysornis brasiliensis  [Physornis brasiliensis ] (Late Oligocene/Early Miocene)
†Brontornis burmeisteri  [Rostrornis ; Rostrornis floweri ; Brontornis platyonyx ] (Early – Middle Miocene)
Cariamidae  – seriemas
†Riacama caliginea 
†Pseudolarus guaraniticus  [Pseudogavia ; Ameghinia ]
†Smiliornis penetrans 
†Noriegavis santacrucensis  [Cariama santacrucensis ]
Prehistoric species of extant genera
Chunga
†C. incerta

Otidiformes
Otididae – bustards
†Gryzaja odessana Zubareva 1939 [Chlamydotis pliodeserti Serebrovskyj 1941; Otis gryzaja Vojinstvens'kyj 1967]
†Ioriotis gabunii Burchak-Abramovich & Vekua 1981
†Miootis compactus Umanskaya 1979
†Pleotis liui Hou 1982
Prehistoric species of extant genera
Chlamydotis Brodkorb 1967 [Otis affinis Lydekker 1891a]
†C. affinis (Lydekker)
†C. mesetaria Sánchez Marco 1990
Tetrax
†T. paratetrax (Bocheński & Kuročkin 1987) [Otis paratetrax Bocheński & Kuročkin 1987]
Otis
†O. bessarabicus Kessler & Gal 1996
†O. hellenica Boev, Lazaridis & Tsoukala 2014
†O. khosatzkii Bocheński & Kuročkin 1987 (Late Pliocene of Varshets, Bulgaria)

Phoenicopteriformes
Placement unresolved
†Phoeniconotius eyrensis Miller 1963 [Phoenicopterus novaehollandiae Miller 1963] (Etadunna Late Oligocene/Early Miocene of Lake Pitikanta, Australia)
†Palaelodidae Stejneger 1885 – Swimming-flamingos
†Adelalopus hoogbutseliensis Mayr & Smith 2002 (stout-legged flamingos) - (Borgloon Early Oligocene of Hoogbutsel, Belgium)
†Palaelodus Milne-Edwards 1863 [Pliogrus Lambrecht 1933] (middle Oligocene –? Middle Pleistocene)
†P. ambiguus Milne-Edwards 1863 [Grus problematica Milne-Edwards 1871; Probalearica problematica (Milne-Edwards 1871); Palaelodus gracilipes Milne-Edwards 1863; Palaelodus crassipes Milne-Edwards 1863; Paloelodus minutus (sic) Milne-Edwards 1868, Grus miocenicus Grigorescu & Kessler 1977]
†P. aotearoa Worthy et al. 2010
†P. germanicus (Lambrecht 1933) [Pliogrus germanicus Lambrecht 1933]
†P. kurochkini Zelenkov 2013
†P. pledgei Baird & Vickers-Rich 1998
†P. wilsoni Baird & Vickers-Rich 1998
†Megapaloelodus Miller 1944 (Late Oligocene – Early Pliocene)
†M. conectens (Miller 1944)
†M. peiranoi Agnolin 2009
†M. goliath (Milne Edwards 1863) Cheneval 1983c [Paloelodus goliath (sic) Milne-Edwards 1868]
†M. opsigonus Brodkorb 1961
Phoenicopteridae – flamingos
†Harrisonavis croizeti (Gervais 1852) Kashin 1978 [Gervaisia Harrison & Walker 1976 non Bonaparte 1854 non Waga 1858 non Robineau-Desvoidy 1863; Phoenicopterus croizeti Gervais 1852; Gervaisia croizeti (Gervais 1852) Harrison & Walker 1976]
†Leakeyornis aethiopicus (Harrison & Walker 1976) Vickers-Rich & Walker 1983 [Phoenicopterus aethiopicus Harrison & Walker 1976]
†Elornis Milne-Edwards 1868 [Elornis Aymard 1856 nomen nudum; Helornis Lydekker 1891; Actiornis] (Middle? Eocene – Early Oligocene)
†E. anglicus Aymard 1856 nomen nudum [Helornis anglicus; Actiornis anglicus Lydekker 1891]
†E. grandis Milne-Edwards 1868 [Elornis grandis 1856 Aymard nomen nudum]
†E. littoralis Milne-Edwards 1868 [Elornis littoralis Aymard 1856 nomen nudum; Elornis antiquus Aymard 1856 nomen nudum; Elornis antiquus Milne-Edwards 1868; Helornis littoralis (Milne-Edwards 1868) Lydekker 1891]
Placement unresolved
Phoenicopteridae gen. et sp. indet. (Middle? – Late Miocene)
Extant genera present in the fossil record
Phoenicopterus (middle Oligocene – Recent)
†P. floridanus Brodkorb 1953
†P. stocki (Miller 1944)
†P. siamensis Cheneval et al. 1991
†P. gracilis Miller 1963 (Early Pleistocene of Lake Kanunka, Australia)

Podicipediformes
Podicipedidae – grebes
†Miobaptus Švec 1982 (Early Miocene)
†M. huzhiricus Zelenkov 2015
†M. walteri Švec 1982 [Podiceps walteri (Švec 1984) Mlíkovský 2000]
†Miodytes serbicus Dimitreijevich, Gál & Kessler 2002
†Pliolymbus baryosteus Murray 1967 (Late Pliocene – Early? Pleistocene)
†Thiornis sociata Navás 1922 [Podiceps sociatus (Navás 1922) Olson] (Late Miocene –? Early Pliocene)
Placement unresolved
Podicipedidae gen. et sp. indet. (Late Pliocene) – formerly included in Podiceps parvus
Podicipedidae gen. et sp. indet. UMMP 49592, 52261, 51848, 52276, KUVP 4484 (Late Pliocene)
Podicipedidae gen. et sp. indet. (Late Pliocene/Early Pleistocene)
Extant genera present in the fossil record
Aechmophorus (Late Pliocene – Recent)
†A. elasson Murray 1967
Podilymbus (Late Pliocene – Recent)
†P. mujusculus Murray 1967
†P. wetmorei Storer 1976
†P. podiceps magnus
Podiceps (Late Oligocene/Early Miocene – Recent)
†P. arndti Chandler 1990
†P. caspicus (Habizl 1783) [Colymbus caspicus Habizl 1783]
†P. csarnotatus Kessler 2009
†P. discors Murray 1967
†P. dixi Brodkorp 1963
†P. miocenicus Kessler 1984
†P. oligocaenus (Shufeldt)
†P. parvus (Shufeldt 1913) [Colymbus parvus Schufeldt 1913]
†P. solidus Kuročkin 1985
†P. subparvus (Miller & Bowman 1958) [Colymbus subparvus Miller & Bowman 1958]

Phaethontiformes
 †Prophaethontidae 
 †Lithoptila abdounensis  (Late Paleocene – Early Eocene of Ouled Abdoun Basin, Morocco)– including Abdounornis
 †Prophaethon shrubsolei   (Late Paleocene ?– Early Eocene)
 Phaethontidae  – tropicbirds
?†Proplegadis fisheri  (London Clay Early Eocene of England) – Threskiornithidae?
 †Phaethusavis pelagicus  (Early Eocene of Ouled Abdoun Basin, Morocco)
 †Heliadornis  (Miocene of North America and Europe)
 †H. ashbyi 
 †H. minor 
 †H. paratethydicus

Ciconiiformes
The diverse group that includes storks, herons and New World vultures. Paraphyletic as listed here.
 †Ciconiidae – storks
 †Ciconiopsis antarctica 
 †Palaeoephippiorhynchus dietrichi  (Early Oligocene)
 †Grallavis edwardsi  [Propelargus edwardsi ; Palaeoephippiorhynchus edwardsi ] (Early Miocene) – may be same as Prociconia
 †Pelargosteon tothi  (Early Pleistocene)
 †Sanshuiornis zhangi 
Placement unresolved
Ciconiidae gen. et sp. indet. – formerly Aquilavus bilinicus ; Cygnus bilinicus  (Early Miocene)
Ciconiidae gen. et sp. indet. (Late Miocene)
cf. Leptoptilos gen. et sp. indet. – formerly Leptoptilos siwalicensis  (Late Miocene? - Late Pliocene)
Ciconiidae gen. et sp. indet. (Late Pleistocene) – Ciconia or Mycteria?
Extant genera present in the fossil record
Ciconia (Early Miocene? – Recent) – includes Xenorhynchus
 †C. lydekkeri  (Middle to Late Pleistocene)
 †C. gaudryi 
 †C. minor 
 †C. sarmatica 
 †C. kahli 
 †C. louisebolesae 
 †C. lucida 
 †C. maltha  (Asphalt/La Brea stork)
 †C. nana  [Xenorhynchus nanus ] (Australian stork)
 †C. stehlini 
Mycteria (Middle Miocene – Recent)
 †M. milleri  [Dissourodes milleri ]
 †M. wetmorei 
Ephippiorhynchus (Late Miocene – Recent)
 †E. tchoufour 
 †E. pakistanensis 
Leptoptilos (Late Miocene – Recent) – includes Cryptociconia
 †L. falconeri  [Argala falconeri ]
 †L. pliocenicus 
 †L. inidcus  [Cryptociconia indica ]
 †L. lüi 
 †L. patagonicus 
 †L. robustus 
 †L. richae 
 †L. titan 
Jabiru (Early Pliocene – Recent)
 †J. codorensis

Pelecaniformes
The group that includes modern pelicans and cormorants. As presented here paraphyletic; the tropicbird lineage is not part of this group and relationships with Procellariiformes and Sphenisciformes require more research. Also, as the pelicans are at least as close to the Ciconiiformes as to cormorants, the latter group is being recognized as Phalacrocoraciiformes by some recent authors and the core Pelecaniformes are occasionally merged into the Ciconiiformes.
 Basal and unresolved forms
 †Piscator tenuirostris  (Early-Late Eocene of England)  (Auk98:199)– basal phalacrococacoid?
 †"Prophalacrocorax ronzoni  [Sula ronzoni ; Mergus ronzoni ] (Early Oligocene of Ronzon, France)
 † "Pelecaniformes" gen. et sp. indet. (Jebel Qatrani Early Oligocene of Fayum, Egypt) basal phalacrococacoid (similar to Piscator?)?
 Fregatidae – frigatebirds
 †Limnofregata  (Early Eocene)
 †L. azygosternon 
 †L. hutchisoni 
 †L. hasegawai 
 Sulidae – gannets and boobies
 †Bimbisula melanodactylus 
 †Eostega lebedinskyi  (Middle/Late Eocene)
 †Empheresula arvenensis   [Sula arvernensis ; Parasula] (Late Oligocene – Middle Miocene)
 †Masillastega rectirostris  (middle Eocene)
 †Microsula pygmaea  [Sula pygmaea; Microsula pygmaea; Sula avita; Enkurosula; Pseudosula] (Late Oligocene – Middle Miocene)
 †Miosula media  (Late Miocene)
 †Palaeosula stocktoni  (?Early Pliocene)
 †Rhamphastosula  (Early Pliocene)
 †R. ramirezi 
 †R. aguirrei 
 †Sarmatosula dobrogensis  (Middle Miocene)
 Placement unresolved
 Sulidae gen. et sp. indet. (Late Oligocene)
 Sulidae gen. et sp. indet. (Late Pliocene)
 Extant genera present in the fossil record
 Morus (Early Miocene – Recent)
 †M. avitus  [Sula (Microsula) avita ; Microsula avitus ]
 †M. lompocanus  [Sula lompocana ]
 †M. loxostylus  [Sula loxostyla ; Morus atlanticus ; Sula atlantica ]
 †M. olsoni 
 †M. peninsularis  [Sula peninsularis ]
 †M. peruvianus  [Sula peruviana ]
 †M. recentior 
 †M. reyanus  (Del Rey gannet)
 †M. vagabundus  [Sula vagabundus ]
 †M. willetti  [Sula willetti ]
 Sula (Middle Pliocene – Recent)
 †S. brandi 
 †S. figueroae 
 †S. clarki 
 †S. humeralis  [Morus humeralis ]
 †S. magna  [Morus magnus ]
 †S. pohli 
 †S. sulita 
 †S. universitatis 

 Phalacrocoracidae – cormorants and shags
 †Borvocarbo  (Late Oligocene of C Europe) – phalacrocoracid? basal phalacrococacoid?
 †B. guilloti 
 †B. tardatus 
 †Limicorallus  (middle Oligocene)
 †L. saiensis 
 †L. carbunculus 
 †Nambashag 
 †N. billerooensis 
 †N. microglaucus 
 †Nectornis  (Late Oligocene?/Early Miocene – Middle Miocene)
 †N. africanus 
 †N. miocaenus  [?Phalacrocorax miocaenus ]
 †N. anatolicus  [Phalacrocorax anatolicus ]
 †Valenticarbo praetermissus  (Late Pliocene/Early Pleistocene) – a nomen dubium
 †Oligocorax Lambrecht 1933
 †O. littoralis  [Phalacrocorax littoralis ]
 †O. stoeffelensis  [Oligocorax sp. ; Borvocarbo stoeffelensis ]
 Placement unresolved
 †Phalacrocoracidae gen. et sp. indet. (Late Eocene ?–? mid-Oligocene)
 Extant genera present in the fossil record
 Phalacrocorax (Oligocene –? Recent) – may be several genera. Includes Australocorax, Miocorax
 †P. gregorii 
 †P. gregorii  [Australocorax vetustus ]
 †P. chapalensis 
 †P. destefani  [Paracorax destefani ]
 †P. femoralis  [Miocorax femoralis ]
 †P. filyawi 
 †P. goletensis 
 †P. ibericus 
 †P. idahensis  [Graculus idahensis ]
 †P. intermedius  [Phalacrocorax praecarbo, Ardea brunhuberi; Phalacrocorax brunhuberi ; Botaurites avitus]
 †P. kennelli 
 †P. kuehneanus 
 †P. longipes  [Pliocarbo longipes ] 
 †P. leptopus 
 †P. macer 
 †P. macropus  [Graculus macropus ]
 †P. marinavis  [Oligocorax marinavis ]
 †P. mongoliensis 
 †P. owrei 
 †P. reliquus 
 †P. rogersi 
 †P. serdicensis 
 †P. tanzaniae 
 †P. wetmorei 
 †Plotopteridae – diving-"boobies"
 †Copepteryx 
 †C. hexeris 
 †C. titan 
 †Hokkaidornis abashiriensis 
 †Phocavis maritimus 
 †Plotopterum joaquinensis 
 †Tonsala 
 †T. hildegardae 
 †T. buchanani 
 †Protoplotidae
 †Protoplotus beauforti  (Paleocene? – middle Eocene of Sumatra)
 Anhingidae – darters
 †Meganhinga chilensis  (Early Miocene)
 †Macranhinga  (giant snake-birds) (Middle/Late Miocene –? Early Pliocene)
 †M. paranensis  [Meganhinga paranensis ]
 †M. ranzii 
 †"Paranavis" (Middle/Late Miocene) – a nomen nudum
 †Giganhinga kiyuensis  (Late Pliocene/Early Pleistocene)
 Extant genera present in the fossil record
 Anhinga (Early Miocene – Recent)
 †A. beckeri 
 †A. hadarensis 
 †A. laticeps  [Plotus laticeps ]
 †A. malagurala 
 †A. pannonica 
 †A. subvolans  [Phalacrocorax subvolans ]
 †A. walterbolesi 
 †A. fraileyi  [?Macranhinga fraileyi ]
 †A. grandis 
 †A. minuta 
 Pelecanidae – pelicans
 †Protopelicanus cuvieri 
 †Miopelecanus Cheneval 1984
 †M. gracilis  [Pelecanus gracilis ]
 †M. intermedius  [Pelecanus intermedius ]
 Extant genera present in the fossil record
 Pelecanus (Late Pliocene – Recent)
 †P. aethiopicus 
 †P. cautleyi 
 †P. fraasi 
 †P. halieus 
 †P. odessanus 
 †P. schreiberi 
 †P. sivalensis 
 †P. tirarensis 

 †Pelagornithidae Fürbringer 1888 – pseudotooth birds
 †Pseudodontornis Lambrecht 1930 [Neodontornis Harrison & Walker 1976; Macrodontopteryx Harrison & Walker 1976; Palaeochenoides Schufeldt 1916] (Late Paleocene – London Clay Early Eocene of England)
 †P. longidentata Harrison & Walker 1976 [Odontopteryx oweni (Harrison & Walker 1976); Macrodontopteryx oweni Harrison & Walker 1976]
 †P. tenuirostris Harrison 1985
 †P. tschulensis (Averianov et al. 1991) [Odontopteryx tschulensis]
 †P. longirostris (Spulski 1910) Lambrecht 1930 [Odontopteryx longirostris Spulski 1910; Palaeochenoides miocaenus Schufeldt 1916; Pelagornis longirostris (Spulski 1910)]
 †P. stirtoni Howard & Warter 1969 [Neodontornis stirtoni (Howard & Warter 1969) Harrison & Walker 1976; Pelagornis stirtoni (Howard & Warter 1969)]
 †Dasornis Owen 1870 [Megalornis Seeley 1866 non Gray 1841; Argillornis Owen 1878] (London Clay Early Eocene of England)
 †D. abdoun Bourdon 2010
 †D. emuinus (Bowerbank 1854) Owen 1870 [Lithornis emuinus Bowerbank 1854; Megalornis emuianus (sic) (Bowerbank 1854) Seeley 1866; Neptuniavis miranda Harrison & Walker 1977; Argillornis longipennis Owen 1878; Dasornis londinensis Owen 1869 nomen nudum; Dasornis londinensis Owen 1870; Argillornis emuinus (Bowerbank 1854) Brodkorb 1963; Argillornis longipes Lambrecht 1933 (lapsus)]
 †D. gigas [Odontopteryx gigas Bourdon 2006 nomen nudum]
 †Macrodontopteryx (London Clay Early Eocene of England)
 †Odontopteryx toliapica Owen 1873 [Odontornis (sic) Owen 1873; Neptuniavis minor Harrison & Walker 1977; Dasornis toliapica (Owen 1873)] (London Clay Early Eocene of England)
 †Gigantornis eaglesomei Andrews 1916 (middle Eocene of Nigeria)
 †Cyphornis magnus Cope 1894 (Eocene of Vancouver, Canada)
 †Osteodontornis orri Howard 1957 [Pelagornis orri Howard 1957] (Early Oligocene – Pliocene)
 †Pelagornis (Middle Miocene of France – Late Pliocene of Morocco)
 †P. miocaenus Lartet 1857 (Miocene false-tooothed pelican)
 †P. mauretanicus Mourer-Chauviré & Geraads 2008
 †P. chilensis Mayr & Rubilar-Rogers 2010
 †P. sandersi Ksepka 2014
 †Caspiodontornis kobystanicus Aslanova & Burčak-Abramovič 1982 [?Guguschia nailiae Aslanova & Burčak-Abramovič 1968]
 †Tympanoneisiotes wetmorei Hopson 1964 [Pelagornis wetmorei (Hopson 1964)]
 †Lutetodontopteryx tethyensis Mayr & Zvonok 2012
 †Aequornis traversei Bourdon 2006 nomen nudum
 Placement unresolved
 ?Pelagornithidae gen. et sp. indet. (middle Eocene)
 †Xenerodiopidae  (Early Oligocene)
 †Xenerodiopus mycter 
Ardeidae – herons
 †Ardeagrandis arborea 
 †Calcardea junnei  (Paleocene)
 †Matuku otagoense 
 †Nyctisoma robusta 
 †Palaeophoyx columbiana 
 †Pikaihao bartlei 
 †Proardea amissa  [Ardea amissa ; Egretta amissa ] (Late Eocene –? Late Oligocene)
 †Proardeola walkeri  [Ardea Formosa ; Ardeola walker ] – possibly same as Proardea
 †Zeltornis ginsburgi  (Early Miocene)
Placement unresolved
 †Anas basaltica Bayer 1882 (Late Oligocene)
Extant genera present in the fossil record
 Nyctanassa 
 †N. kobdoena 
 Ardea (Middle Miocene – Recent)
 †A. aurelianensis  [Proardea aurelianensis ] 
 †A. polkensis 
 †A. howardae 
 †A. paloccidentalis 
 †A. sytchevskayae 
 Egretta (Late Miocene/Early Pliocene – Recent)
 †E. polgardiensis 
 †E. subfluvia 
 Butorides (Early Pleistocene – Recent)
 †B. validipes 
 Botaurus
 †B. hibbardi 
 Syrigma
 †S. sanctimartini 
Scopidae – hammerkop
Prehistoric species of extant genera
 †Scopus xenopus 
Threskiornithidae – ibises
Threskiornithidae gen. et sp. indet. NMMP-KU 1301 (Pondaung middle Eocene of Paukkaung, Myanmar) – Threskiornithinae?
 †Gerandibis paganus  [Milnea Lydekker ; Ibis pagana ; Eudocimus paganus ; Plegadis paganus ; Actiornis pagana ; Milnea gracilis ; Plegadis gracilis ]
 †Rhynchaeites messelensis  [Plumumida ; Plumumida lutetialis ] (middle Eocene of Messel, Germany) – may include Mopsitta
 †Vadaravis brownae 
Extant genera present in the fossil record
Geronticus (Middle Miocene – Recent)
 †G. perplexus  [Ardea perplexa ; Proardea perplexus ]
 †G. apelex 
 †G. olsoni 
Platalea
 †P. chione  [Ajaia chione ]
 †P. tiangangensis  (Xiacaowan Middle Miocene of Sihong, China)
Plegadis
 †P. pharangites  [Plegadis gracilis ] (Late Pliocene of WC US)
Theristicus
 †T. wetmorei  (Late Pleistocene of Peru)
Eudocimus
 †E. leiseyi   (Early Pleistocene of Florida)
 †E. peruvianus   (Late Pleistocene of Peru; may be living species)
 †Eudocimus sp. (Middle Pliocene of Florida)
Balaenicipitidae – shoebills
Goliathia andrewsi  (Late Eocene/Early Oligocene of Egypt)
Paludiavis richae  (Late Miocene of Tunisia and Pakistan)

Procellariiformes
The group that includes modern albatrosses, petrels and storm-petrels.
Placement unresolved
†Eopuffinus kazachstanensis  (Late Paleocene of Zhylga, Kazakhstan)
†Makahala mirae 
†Proaestrelata 
†Marinavidae 
†Marinavis longirostris 
†Tytthostonychidae 
†Tytthostonyx glauconiticus 
†Diomedeoididae 
†Rupelornis van Beneden 1871 [Gaviota ; Ardeita ; Diomedeoides ; Frigidafrons ] (Early Oligocene– Early Miocene of C Europe and Iran)
†R. harmati  [Diomedeoides harmati ]
†R. definitus  [Vanellus selysii ; Anas creccoides ; Gaviota lipsiensis ; Diomedeoides minimus ; Frigidafrons brodkorbi ; Ardeita gracilis ; Diomedeoides lipsiensis ; Diomedeoides brodkorbi ]
†R. babaheydariensis  [Frigidafons babaheydariensis ; Diomedeoides babaheydariensis ]
Oceanitidae
Extant genera present in the fossil record
Oceanites
†O. zaloscarthmus 
Diomedeidae – albatrosses
†Murunkus subitus  (middle Eocene)
†Plotornis  [Chenornis ] (Early – Middle Miocene)
†P. arvernensis  [Puffinus arvernensis ; Puffinus arvernensis ]
†P. deltortrii 
†P. graculoides  [Chenornis graculoides ]
†Tydea septentrionalis  (Early Oligocene of the North Sea basin)
†Diomedeidae gen. et sp. indet. (Late Oligocene of South Carolina)
Extant genera present in the fossil record
Diomedea (Middle Miocene – Recent)
†D. anglica 
†D. howardae 
†D. milleri 
†D. rumana 
†D. tanakai 
†D. thyridata 
Phoebastria (Middle Miocene – Recent)
†P. rexsularum 
Thalassarche (Late Miocene – Recent)
†T. thyridata 
Hydrobatidae – storm-petrels
†Primodroma bournei  (Early Eocene)
Prehistoric species of extant genera
†"Oceanodroma" hubbsi  (Hubbs' Storm-petrel)(Capistrano Middle/Late Miocene of Orange County, US)
†Pelagodroma sp. 1
Pelagodroma sp. 2
Procellariidae – petrels
†Argyrodyptes microtarsus  (San Julián Late Eocene/Early Oligocene of Chubut, Argentina)
†Pterodromoides minoricensis 
Extant genera present in the fossil record
Calonectris (Early Pliocene – Recent)
†C. krantzi 
†C. kurodai 
†C. wingatei 
Fulmarus (Middle Miocene – Recent)
†F. hammeri 
†F. miocaenus 
Pachyptila (Late Miocene– Recent)
†P. salax 
Pelecanoides (Early/Middle Miocene – Recent)
†P. cymatotrypetes 
†P. miokuaka  (Miocene diving petrel)
†P. urinatrix 
"Pterodroma" (Pleistocene – Recent)
†P. kurodai 
†P. rupinarum 
Puffinus (Early Oligocene – Recent)
†P. aquitanicus  Procellaria aquitanica 
†P. antiquus  Procellaria antiqua 
†P. barnesi 
†P. calhouni 
†P. conradi 
†P. diatomicus 
†P. felthami 
†P. gilmorei 
†P. inceptor 
†P. kanakoffi 
†P. micraulax 
†P. mitchelli 
†P. nestori 
†P. priscus 
†P. raemdonckii  [Larus Raemdonckii Beneden 1871]
†P. tedfordi

Gaviiformes
†Gaviella pusilla (Shufeldt 1915) Wetmore 1940 
†Nasidytes ypresianus (Mayr & Kitchener, 2022)
Gaviidae – loons
†Colymboides Milne-Edwards 1867 [Dyspetornis Oberholser 1905; Hydrornis Milne-Edwards 1867 non Blyth 1843; Davisona Mathews 1935; Megagallinula Kuročkin 1968] (Late Eocene – Early Miocene) – paraphyletic?
†C. harundinea (Kuročkin 1968) Megagallinula harundinea Kuročkin 1968)
†C. metzleri Mayr 2004
†C. anglicus Lydekker 1891a
†C. belgicus Mayr & Smith 2002
†C. minutus Milne-Edwards 1867
 Placement unresolved
"Gavia" portisi (Late Pliocene of Orciano Pisano, Italy) – rentatively placed here. A nomen dubium?
Extant genera present in the fossil record
Gavia (Early Miocene – Recent)
†G. egeriana Švec 1982
†G. brodkorbi Howard 1978
†G. paradoxa Umanskaja 1981
†G. schultzi Mlíkovsky 1998
†G. howardae Brodkorb 1953c
†G. moldavica Kessler 1984
†G. concinna Wetmore 1940 [Gavia palaeodytes Wetmore 1943]
†G. fortis Olson & Rasmussen 2001

Sphenisciformes

Unresolved and basal forms
†Waimanu Jones, Ando & Fordyce 2006 (Early – Late Palaeocene)
†W. manneringi Jones, Ando & Fordyce 2006 (Mannering's penguin)
†W. tuatahi Jones, Ando & Fordyce 2006 (Waipara penguin)
†Perudyptes devriesi Clarke et al. 2007 – basal? (middle Eocene)
Sphenisciformes gen. et sp. indet. CADIC P 21 (middle Eocene)
Spheniscidae – penguins
†Kaiika maxwelli Fordyce & Tomas 2011
†Palaeoapterodytes ictus (Ameghino 1891) Ameghino 1905 (nomen dubium) [Apterodytes Ameghino 1891 non Hermann 1783; Apterodytes ictus Ameghino 1891]
†Tereingaornis moisleyi Scarlett 1983 (Moisley's penguin)
†Crossvallia unienwillia Tambussi et al. 2005 (Late Paleocene)
†Anthropornis Wiman 1905 (mid-Eocene –? Early Oligocene)
†A. nordenskjoeldii Wiman 1905 (Nordenskjoeld's giant penguin)
†A. grandis (Wiman 1905) [Arthrodytes grandis  (Ameghino 1901) Ameghino 1905]
†Archaeospheniscus Marples 1952 (mid-/Late Eocene – Late Oligocene)
†A. lowei Marples 1952 (Lowe's penguin)
†A. lopdelli Marples 1952 (Lopdell's penguin)
†Delphinornis Wiman 1905 [Notodyptes Marples 1953] (mid-/Late Eocene –? Early Oligocene)
†D. gracilis Myrcha et al. 2002
†D. larseni Wiman 1905
†D. arctowskii Myrcha et al. 2002
†D. wimani (Marples 1953) Ksepka & Clarke 2010 [Notodyptes wimani Marples 1953; Archaeospheniscus wimani (Marples 1953) Simpson 1971a]
†Palaeeudyptes Huxley 1859 [Eosphaeniscus Wiman 1905] (mid-/Late Eocene – Late Oligocene)
†P. klekowskii Myrcha, Tatur & del Valle 1990
†P. gunnari (Wiman 1905) [Eosphaeniscus gunnari Wiman 1905]
†Icadyptes salasi Clarke et al. 2007 (Late Eocene)
†Inkayacu paracasensis Clarke et al. 2010 (Late Eocene)
†Pachydyptes ponderosus Oliver 1930 (Late Eocene)
†Marambiornis exilis Myrcha et al. 2002 (Late Eocene–? Early Oligocene)
†Mesetaornis polaris Myrcha et al. 2002 (Late Eocene –? Early Oligocene)
†Tonniornis Tambussi et al. 2006 (Late Eocene –? Early Oligocene)
†T. mesetaensis Tambussi et al. 2006
†T. minimum Tambussi et al. 2006
†Wimanornis seymourensis Simpson 1971 (Late Eocene –? Early Oligocene)
†Arthrodytes andrewsi Ameghino 1901 (Late Eocene/Early Oligocene – Early Miocene)
†Duntroonornis parvus Marples 1953 (Duntroon penguin) (Late Oligocene)
†Kairuku Ksepka et al. 2012 (Late Oligocene)
†K. grebneffi Ksepka et al. 2012
†K. waitaki Ksepka et al. 2012
†Korora oliveri Marples 1952 (Oliver's penguin) (Late Oligocene)
†Platydyptes Marples 1952 (Late Oligocene)
†P. marplesi (Brodkorb 1963) Simpson 1971 [Palaeeudyptes marplesi Brodkorb 1963] (Simpson's/Marples' penguin)
†P. novaezealandiae(Oliver 1930) Marples 1952 (wide-flippered penguin)
†P. amiesi Marples 1952 (Amies’ penguin)
†Eretiscus tonnii (Simpson 1981) Olson 1986 [Microdytes Simpson 1981 non Balfour-Browne 1949; Microdytes tonnii Simpson 1981] (Patagonia Early Miocene)
†Palaeospheniscus Moreno & Mercerat 1891 [Neculus Ameghino 1905; Paraspheniscus Ameghino 1905 nec Hendel 1927; Perispheniscus Ameghino 1905; Pseudospheniscus Ameghino 1905; Chubutodyptes Simpson 1970] (Early? – Late Miocene/Early Pliocene)
†P. huxleyorum Simpson 1973
†P. wimani (Ameghino 1905) [Perispheniscus wimani Ameghino 1905; Palaeospheniscus robustus (partim) Simpson 1946]
†P. gracilis Ameghino 1899 [?Delphinornis gracilis; Palaeospheniscus nereius Ameghino 1901; Neculus rothi Ameghino 1905; Palaeospheniscus rothi Ameghino 1905; Paraspheniscus nereius (Ameghino 1901) Ameghino 1905; Palaeospheniscus medianus Ameghino 1905]
†P. patagonicus Moreno & Mercerat 1891 [Palaeospheniscus menzbieri Moreno & Mercerat 1891; Palaeospheniscus interruptus Ameghino 1905; Palaeospheniscus intermedius Ameghino 1905; Palaeospheniscus affinis Ameghino 1905]
†P. bergi Moreno & Mercerat 1891 [Paraspheniscus bergi (Moreno & Mercerat 1891) Ameghino 1905; Palaeospheniscus planus Ameghino 1905; Palaeospheniscus interplanus Ameghino 1905; Pseudospheniscus interplanus Ameghino 1905; Pseudospheniscus planus Ameghino 1905 nom rej.; Pseudospheniscus concavus Ameghino 1905; Pseudospheniscus convexus Ameghino 1905 nom rej.]
†P. biloculata (Simpson 1970) Acosta Hospitaleche 2007 [Chubutodyptes biloculata Simpson 1970]
†Paraptenodytes Ameghino 1891 [Isotremornis Ameghino 1905; Metancylornis Ameghino 1905; Treleudytes Ameghino 1905] (Early – Late Miocene/Early Pliocene)
†P. brodkorbi Simpson 1972 [Isotremornis nordenskjöldi Ameghino 1905 (partim)]
†P. robustus (Ameghino 1895) [Palaeospheniscus robustus Ameghino 1895; Perispheniscus robustus (Ameghino 1895) Brodkorb 1963; Paraptenodytes curtus Ameghino 1901; Metancylornis curtus (Ameghino 1901) Ameghino 1905; Paraptenodytes grandis Ameghino 1901; Arthrodytes grandis (Ameghino 1901) Ameghino 1905; Paraptenodytes andrewsi Ameghino 1901; Arthrodytes andrewsi (Ameghino 1901) Ameghino 1905; Treleudytes crassus Ameghino 1905]
†P. antarcticus (Huxley 1859) Ameghino 1891 [Palaeeudyptes antarcticus Huxley 1859 non Hector 1873; Palaeospheniscus antarcticus (Huxley 1859) Moreno & Mercerat 1891] (narrow-flippered penguin)
†Anthropodyptes gilli Simpson 1959 (Middle Miocene)
†Madrynornis mirandus Hospitaleche et al. 2007 (Late Miocene)
†Pseudaptenodytes Simpson 1970 (Late Miocene/Early Pliocene)
†P. minor Simpson 1970
†P. macraei Simpson 1970
†Dege hendeyi Simpson 1979 (Early Pliocene)
†Marplesornis novaezealandiae (Marples 1960) Simpson 1972 [Paleospheniscus novaezealandiae Marples 1960] (Harris penguins) (Early Pliocene)
†Nucleornis insolitus Simpson 1979 (Early Pliocene)
†Inguza predemersus (Simpson 1971) Simpson 1975 [Spheniscus predemersus Simpson 1971] (Late Pliocene)
Placement unresolved
Spheniscidae gen. et sp. indet (Late Oligocene/Early Miocene of Hakataramea, New Zealand)
Extant genera present in the fossil record
Pygoscelis (Middle/Late Miocene – Recent)
†P. calderensis Walsh & Suárez 2006
†P. tyreei Simpson 1972 (Tyree's penguin)
†P. grandis Walsh & Suárez 2006
Spheniscus (Middle/Late Miocene – Recent)
†S. muizoni Göhlich 2007
†S. chilensis Emslie & Correa 2003
†S. megaramphus Stucchi, Urbina & Giraldo 2003
†S. urbinai Stucchi 2002
Aptenodytes (Early? Pliocene – Recent)
†A. ridgeni Simpson 1972 [Arthrodytes ridgeni (Simpson 1972)] (Ridgen's Penguin)
Eudyptes
†E. calauina Hoffmeister et al. 2014

Pterocliformes
Pteroclidae – sandgrouse
†Gerandia calcaria (Milne-Edwards 1869) Lambrecht 1933 [Columba calcaria Milne-Edwards 1869] (Early Miocene)
†Leptoganga sepultus (Milne-Edwards 1869) Mourer-Chauviré 1993 [Pterocles sepultus Milne-Edwards 1869]
†Archaeoganga Mourer-Chauviré 1992 
†A. validus(Milne-Edwards 1892) [Pterocles validus Milne-Edwards 1892]
†A. pinguis Mourer-Chauviré 1992
†A. larvatus (Milne-Edwards 1892) [Pterocles larvatus Milne-Edwards 1892]
Extant genera present in the fossil record
Syrrhaptes
†S. kashini Kuročkin 1985

Columbiformes
Columbidae – doves and pigeons
Arenicolumba (Early Miocene) – doubtfully distinct from Patagioenas
Rupephaps (Early Miocene)
Placement unresolved
Columbidae gen. et sp. indet. (Early/Middle Miocene)
Extant genera present in the fossil record
Columba (Early Pliocene – Recent)
Patagioenas (Early Pliocene – Recent)

Psittaciformes
Unresolved and basal fossil parrots:
Psittacopes (Early/middle Eocene)
Serudaptus – pseudasturid or psittacid?
Pseudasturidae (= Halcyornithidae?)
Messelasturidae 
Tynskya eocaena  (Early Eocene of N America and England)
Messelastur gratulator  (middle Eocene of Messel, Germany)

Pseudasturidae FU 125 gen. et sp. indet. (Early Eocene)
Pseudasturides – formerly Pseudastur
Vastanavidae
Vastanavis (Early Eocene of Vastan, India)
Quercypsittidae
Quercypsitta (Late Eocene)
Cacatuidae
Extant genera present in the fossil record
Cacatua (Early Miocene – Recent)
Psittacidae – parrots, parakeets and lories
Archaeopsittacus (Late Oligocene/Early Miocene)
Xenopsitta (Early Miocene)
Psittacidae gen. et spp. indet. (Early/Middle Miocene) – several species
Bavaripsitta (Middle Miocene)
Psittacidae gen. et sp. indet. (Middle Miocene) – erroneously placed in Pararallus dispar, includes "Psittacus lartetianus
Extant and recently extinct genera present in the fossil record
Conuropsis (Early? Miocene – Holocene)
Nandayus (Late Pliocene – Recent)
Cyanoliseus (Middle Pleistocene – Recent)
Aratinga (Late Pleistocene – Recent)
Rhynchopsitta (Late Pleistocene – Recent)
Strigopidae – New Zealand parrots, kakapo
Nelepsittacus (Middle Miocene)
Heracles (Middle Miocene)

Opisthocomiformes
Hoatzins
Opisthocomidae  [Foratidae ; Onychopterygidae ]
†Foro panarium  (Early Eocene) - cuculiform?
†Hoatzi panarium 
†Onychopteryx simpsoni  (Early Eocene of Argentina) – falconid? A nomen dubium
†Protoazin parisiensis 
†Namibiavis senutae  (Late Oligocene of Namibia)
†Hoazinavis lacustris  (Miocene of Brazil)
†Hoazinoides magdalenae  (Late Miocene of Colombia)

Musophagiformes
Musophagidae – turacos
Placement unresolved
Musophagidae gen. et sp. indet. (Late Oligocene – Middle Miocene of WC Europe)
Musophagidae gen. et sp. indet. (Egypt)
†Veflintornis  [Apopempsis ] (Middle Miocene)
†V. meini  [Musophaga meini ]
†V. africanus  [Musophaga africanus ; Apopempsis africanus ] (Early Miocene)

Cuculiformes
Cuckoos, turacos and allies.
Placement unresolved
Cuculiformes gen. et sp. indet. (Early Eocene)
Cuculidae – cuckoos
Eocuculus (Late Eocene)
Dynamopterus (Late Eocene/Early Oligocene)
Neococcyx (Early Oligocene)
Cursoricoccyx (Early Miocene)
Placement unresolved
Cuculidae gen. et sp. indet. (Early Pliocene)

Accipitriformes

†Teratornithidae – teratorns
†Argentavis magnificens  (Late Miocene)
†Aiolornis incredibilis  [Teratornis incredibilis ] (Early Pliocene – Late Pleistocene)
†Oscaravis olsoni  [Teratornis olsoni ] (Cuban teratorn)(Pleistocene)
†Cathartornis gracilis 
†Taubatornis campbelli 
†Teratornis  (Early Pleistocene – Late Pleistocene)
†T. woodburnensis 
†T. merriami  (Merriam's teratorn)
Cathartidae – New World vultures
†Brasilogyps faustoi  (Late Oligocene – Early Miocene)
†Kuntur cardenasi 
†Pleistovultur nevesi 
†Tapinopus ellioti 
†Diatropornis ellioti (European vulture) (Late Eocene/Early Oligocene –? middle Oligocene)
†Phasmagyps patritus  (Early Oligocene)
†Hadrogyps aigialeus  (American dwarf vulture) (Middle Miocene)
†Pliogyps  (Miocene vulture) (Late Miocene – Late Pliocene)
†P. charon 
†P. fisheri 
†Perugyps diazi  (Peruvian vulture) (Late Miocene/Early Pliocene)
†Dryornis (Argentinean vulture)  (Early Miocene – Late Pliocene) – similar to the extant genus Vultur
†D. pampeanus 
†D. hatcheri 
†Aizenogyps toomeyae  (South American vulture) (Late Pliocene)
†Breagyps clarki  (long-legged vulture) (Late Pleistocene)
†Geronogyps reliquus  (Late Pleistocene)
†Wingegyps cartellei  (Amazonian vulture) (Late Pleistocene)
†Parasarcoramphus milneedwardsi 
Placement unresolved
Cathartidae gen. et sp. indet. (Late Oligocene of Mongolia)
Cathartidae gen. et sp. indet. (Late Miocene/Early Pliocene of Lee Creek Mine, US)
Cathartidae gen. et sp. indet. (Middle Pliocene of Argentina)
Cathartidae gen. et sp. indet. (Cuba)
Extant genera present in the fossil record
Sarcoramphus (Middle Pliocene –? Recent)
†S. kernense (Kern vulture)
†S. fischeri 
Gymnogyps (Early Pleistocene – Recent)
†G. howardae 
†G. kofordi 
Vultur (Pliocene – Recent)– distinctiveness disputed
†V. fossilis  [Cathartes fossilis; Sarcoramphus fossilis]
†Horusornithidae 
†Horusornis vianeyliaudae  (Late Eocene)Pandionidae – ospreysExtant genera present in the fossil record
Pandion (Early Oligocene – Recent)
†P. lovensis 
†P. homalopteron Sagittariidae – secretarybirds
†Amanuensis pickfordi 
†Pelargopappus (Late Eocene/Early Oligocene – Late Oligocene/Early Miocene of France) – formerly Amphiserpentarius/Amynoptilon/Pelargopsis
†P. schlosseri
†P. magnusAccipitridae – hawks, eagles and Old World vultures
Milvoides (Late Eocene)
Aquilavus (Late Eocene/Early Oligocene – Early Miocene)
Palaeocircus (Late Eocene/Early Oligocene)
Palaeastur (Early Miocene)
Pengana (Early Miocene)
Promilio (Early Miocene)
Proictinia (Early – Late Miocene/Early Pliocene)
Neophrontops (Early/middle Miocene – Late Pleistocene) – formerly in Neophron
Mioaegypius (middle Miocene)
Apatosagittarius (Late Miocene)
Gansugyps (Late Miocene)
Palaeoborus (Miocene)
Qiluornis (Miocene)
Thegornis (Miocene)
Garganoaetus (Early Pliocene)
Amplibuteo (Late Pliocene of Peru – Late Pleistocene) – Belongs to the extant genus Buteogallus
Cryptogyps (Middle – Late Pleistocene)
Neogyps (Late Pleistocene)
Palaeohierax – includes "Aquila" gervaisiiPlacement unresolvedAccipitridae gen. et sp. indet. AMNH FR 7434 (Early Eocene)
Accipitridae gen. et sp. indet. (Early Oligocene)
Accipitridae gen. et sp. indet. (Early/Middle Miocene)
Accipitridae gen. et sp. indet. MPEF-PV-2523 (Late Miocene)
Accipitridae gen. et sp. indet. (Early/Middle Pliocene) – Parabuteo?
Accipitridae gen. et sp. indet. (Late Pliocene/Early Pleistocene) – Buteo?
Accipitridae gen. et sp. indet. (Egypt)
"Aquila" danana (Late Miocene/Early Pliocene) – formerly also Geranoaetus or ButeoExtant genera present in the fossil recordHaliaeetus (Early Oligocene – Recent)
Buteo (middle Oligocene – Recent)
Aquila (Middle Miocene – Recent)
Buteogallus (Middle Miocene – Recent) – might include Harpyhaliaetus
"Hieraaetus" (Middle Miocene – Recent) – doubtfully distinct from Aquila
Milvus (Early Pleistocene – Recent)
Gyps (Middle Pleistocene – Recent)
Aegypius (Middle Pleistocene – Recent)Additional prehistoric species of extant generaSpizaetus grinnelli (Rancho La Brea Late Pleistocene of California, US) – formerly Geranoaetus or Buteo
Spizaetus pliogryps – formerly Aquila
Gypaetus georgii (Late Miocene)
Neophron lolis (Late Miocene)

Falconiformes
†Masillaraptoridae 
†Masillaraptor parvunguis  (middle Eocene of Messel, Germany)
†Danielsraptor phorusrhacoides  (early Eocene of Essex, England)Falconidae – falcons
†Lagopterus minutus 
†Parvulivenator watteli  (Early Eocene)
†Stintonornis mitchelli  (Early Eocene)
†Badiostes patagonicus  (Early Miocene)
†Pediohierax ramenta  [Falco ramenta ]  - (Middle Miocene) 
†Thegornis musculosus  [Thegornis debilis ; Buteo musculosus ]
†Petrosushkinia pliocaena  [Sushkinia ; Sushkinia pliocaena ] (Early Pliocene)
†Falconidae gen. et sp. indet. (Late Miocene)Extant genera present in the fossil recordMilvago (Late Pleistocene -–Recent)
†M. alexandri 
†M. brodkorbi 
Falco (Late Miocene – Recent)
†F. antiquus 
†F. bakalovi 
†F. bulgaricus 
†F. chowi 
†F. hezhengensis 
†F. medius 
†F. oregonus 
†F. pisanus 
†F. umanskajae 

Steatornithiformes
Paraprefica  (Early Eocene?) 
†P. kelleri 
†P. major Steatornithidae – oilbirds
†Prefica nivea Prehistoric species of extant generaSteatornis sp.Nyctibiidae – potoos
†Euronyctibius kurochkini 

Podargiformes
†Fluvioviridavidae 
†Fluvioviridavis platyrhamphus  (Green River Early Eocene of N America)Podargidae – frogmouths
†Masillapodargus longipes 
†Quercypodargus olsoni 

CaprimulgiformesCaprimulgidae – nightjars
†Ventivorus ragei Prehistoric species of extant generaCaprimulgus
†C. piurensis 

Aegotheliformes
Owlet-nightjarsAegothelidae†Quipollornis koniberi  (Early/Middle Miocene)Extant genera present in the fossil recordAegotheles (Early/Middle Miocene – Recent)
†A. savesi  (New Caledonian owlet-nightjar)
†A. zealandivetus 

Apodiformes
Swifts and hummingbirds.
†Wyomingcypselus pohli 
†Procypseloides mourerchauvireae  (Late Eocene/Early Oligocene – Early Miocene)
†Laputavis robusta  [Laputa ; Laputa robusta ]
†Palescyvus escampensis 
†Scaniacypselus  (Early – middle Eocene)
†S. wardi 
†S. szarskii  [Aegialornis szarskii ; Primapus szarskii ]
†Aegialornithidae 
†Primapus lacki  [?Procuculus minutus ] (Early Eocene) ?apodid
†Aegialornis  [Tachyornis ; Belornis ; Mesogiornis ](Early? – Late Eocene)
†A. leenhardti 
†A. germanicus 
†A. gallicus  [Tachyornis hirundo ]
†A. wetmorei  [Mesogiornis wetmorei ]
†A. broweri  [Mesogiornis broweri ]
†Eocypselidae  – apodiform (hemiprocnid?)? caprimulgiform? basal Cypselomorphae?
†Eocypselus   (Late Paleocene ?- Early Eocene of NC Europe)
†E. vincenti 
†E. rowei 
†Cypselavidae 
†Parargornis messelensis  (middle Eocene)  jungornithid, trochilid, basal as Argornis?
†Argornis caucasicus  (Late Eocene)   ?Trochilidae
†Cypselavus gallicus  (Late Eocene Early Oligocene)  aegialornithid or hemiprocnid
†Jungornithidae 
†Jungornis  (Early Oligocene of N Caucasus, Russia)
†J. tesselatus 
†J. geraldmayri Trochilidae  hummingbirds
†Eurotrochilus  (Early Oligocene)
†E. inexpectatus 
†E. noniewiczi Placement unresolvedTrochilidae sp. et gen. indet. (Bahamas, West Indies)
Trochilidae sp. et gen. indet. (Brazil)Apodidae – swiftsExtant genera present in the fossil recordCollocalia (Early Miocene – Recent)
Apus (Middle/Late Miocene – Recent)
Chaetura (Late Miocene – Recent)
Tachornis (Late Pleistocene – Recent)

Coliiformes
Mousebirds and relativesUnresolved and basal forms †Botauroides parvus  (Eocene of Wyoming, US)
 †Eobucco brodkorbi  - sandcoleid?
 †Eocolius walkeri  (London Clay Early Eocene of Walton-on-the-Naze, England) - sandcoleid or coliid
†Limnatornis  (Early Miocene of Saint-Gérand-le-Puy, France) - coliid? (Urocolius?) 
 †Coliiformes gen. et sp. indet. (Late Miocene of Kohfidisch, Austria)
†Uintornis  - sandcoleid?
 Family †Chascacocoliidae 
 Genus †Chascacocolius  (Late Paleocene ?- Early Eocene) - basal? sandcoleid?
 Family †Selmeidae 
†Selmes absurdipes  (Middle Eocene ?-Late Oligocene of C Europe) - coliid? (synonym of Primocolius?)
 Family †Sandcoleidae 
†Sandcoleus copiosus  (Paleocene) 
†Anneavis anneae  
†Eoglaucidium pallas  
 Family Coliidae 
†Primocolius  (Late Eocene/Oligocene of Quercy, France)
†Oligocolius  (Early Oligocene of Frauenweiler, Germany)
†Masillacolius brevidactylus  (middle Eocene of Messel, Germany)Extant genera present in the fossil record Colius [Necrornis ]

†Zealandornithidae
 †Zealandornis relictus  (Early Miocene of Otago, New Zealand)

Strigiformes
Owls and barn owlsUnresolved and basal formsBerruornis (Late Paleocene) – basal? Sophornithidae?
Strigiformes gen. et sp. indet. (Late Paleocene)
Palaeoglaux (middle – Late Eocene) – own family Palaeoglaucidae or Strigidae?
Palaeobyas (Late Eocene/Early Oligocene) – Tytonidae? Sophiornithidae?
Palaeotyto (Late Eocene/Early Oligocene) – Tytonidae?
Strigiformes gen. et spp. indet. (Early Oligocene)OgygoptyngidaeOgygoptynx (Middle/Late Paleocene)ProtostrigidaeEostrix (Early – middle Eocene)
Minerva (middle – Late Eocene) – formerly Protostrix, includes "Aquila" ferox, "Aquila" lydekkeri, and "Bubo" leptosteus
 Oligostrix (middle Oligocene)SophiornithidaeSophiornisStrigidae – typical owls
Mioglaux (Late Oligocene? – Early Miocene) – includes "Bubo" poirreiri
Intulula (Early/Middle –? Late Miocene) – includes "Strix/Ninox" brevis
Alasio (Middle Miocene) – includes "Strix" collongensis
Oraristrix (Late Pleistocene)
Miosurnia (Late Miocene)Placement unresolved"Otus" wintershofensis (Early/Middle Miocene) – may be close to extant genus Ninox
"Strix" edwardsi (Middle/Late? Miocene)
"Asio" pygmaeus (Early Pliocene)
Strigidae gen. et sp. indet. UMMP V31030 (Late Pliocene) – Strix/Bubo?Extant genera present in the fossil recordStrix (Early Miocene – Recent)
Bubo (Late Miocene? – Recent)
Asio (Late Pliocene – Recent)
Athene (Late Pliocene – Recent)
Glaucidium (Late Pliocene – Recent)
Surnia (Late Pliocene – Recent)
Pulsatrix (Late Pleistocene – Recent)Tytonidae – barn owls
Nocturnavis (Late Eocene/Early Oligocene)
Selenornis (Late Eocene/Early Oligocene)
Necrobyas (Late Eocene/Early Oligocene – Early Miocene)
Prosybris (Early Oligocene? – Early Miocene)Placement unresolvedTytonidae gen. et sp. indet. TMT 164 (Middle Miocene)Extant genera present in the fossil recordTyto (Late Miocene – Recent)

Coraciiformes
Rollers and allies. Probably paraphyletic.Basal and unresolved forms†Quasisyndactylus longibrachis  (middle Eocene) – alcediniform, basal?
†Paracoracias occidentalis 
†Cryptornis antiquus  (Late Eocene) – bucerotid? geranopterid?
†Protornis glarniensis  (Oligocene) – basal to motmotids and meropids?
† Coraciiformes gen. et spp. indet. PQ 1216, QU 15640 (Late Eocene) – 2 species
†Geranopteridae 
†Geranopterus  (Late Eocene – Early Miocene)
†G. alatus 
†G. bohemicus  [Nupharanassa bohemica ]
†G. milneendwardsi 
†Eocoraciidae 
†Eocoracias brachyptera  (middle Eocene)
†Primobucconidae 
†Primobucco  [Neanis ] (Early – middle Eocene)
†P. kestneri  [Neanis kestneri ]
†P. frugilegus 
†P. mcgrewi 
†P. perneri Todidae – todies
†Palaeotodus Olson 1976 (Late Eocene of France – Early Oligocene of WC Europe and Wyoming)
†P. emryi 
†P. escampsiensis 
†P. itardiensis Motmotidae – motmotsPlacement unresolvedMomotidae gen. et sp. indet. (Late Miocene)Coraciidae†Miocoracias chenevali Extant genera present in the fossil recordEurystomus
†E. beremedensis 

Bucerotiformes
†Messelirrisoridae†Messelirrisor Mayr 1998 (middle Eocene)
†M. halcyorostris 
†M. parvus 
†M. grandis Phoeniculidae (woodhoopoes)
†Phirriculus pinicola Bucerotidae – hornbills
†Euroceros bulgaricus  (Late Miocene of Hadzhidimovo, Bulgaria)Extant genera present in the fossil recordBucorvus
†B. brailloni 

TrogoniformesTrogonidae – trogons
†Foshanornis songi 
†Septentrogon madseni Kristoffersen 2002 (Fur Late Paleocene/Early Eocene of Ejerslev, Denmark)
†Paratrogon gallicus  [Trogon gallicus ] (Early Miocene of France)
†Primotrogon  [Masillatrogon ] (middle Eocene of Messel, Germany? - Early Oligocene of France)
†P. wintersteini 
†P. pumilio  [Masillatrogon pumilio ]Placement unresolvedTrogonidae gen. et sp. indet. 1 (NW Europe)
Trogonidae gen. et sp. indet. 2 (NW Europe)

PiciformesPlacement unresolvedPiciformes gen. et sp. indet. IRScNB Av 65 (Early Oligocene)
Rupelramphastoides (Early Oligocene) – ramphastid?
Piciformes gen. et sp. indet. SMF Av 429 (Late Oligocene)
Capitonides (Early – Middle Miocene) – ramphastid? "capitonid" (Lybiidae, Megalaimidae)? own family Capitonididae?
Pici gen. et sp. indet. (Middle Miocene) – "capitonid" (Lybiidae, Megalaimidae?)MiopiconidaeMiopicoLybiidae – African barbets
Lybiidae gen. et sp. indet. (Late Miocene) – extant genus Pogoniulus?GalbulidaeExtant genera present in the fossil recordGalbula hylochoreutes (Middle Miocene of La Venta, Colombia)PicavidaePicavusPicidae – woodpeckers
Palaeopicus (Late Oligocene)
Palaeonerpes (Early Pliocene)
Pliopicus (Early Pliocene)Placement unresolvedPicidae gen. et sp. indet. (Middle Miocene)
Picidae gen. et sp. indet. (Late Miocene)
cf. Colaptes DMNH 1262 (Early Pliocene of Ainsworth, US)Extant genera present in the fossil recordCampephilus (Late Pleistocene – Recent)
Colaptes
DendrocoposAdditional prehistoric subspecies of extant speciesMelanerpes superciliaris ssp. (Little Exuma, Bahamas)
Melanerpes superciliaris ssp. (New Providence, Bahamas)

PasseriformesPlacement unresolvedPasseriformes gen. et spp. indet. (Early Eocene) – several species, oscine?
Resoviaornis (Early Oligocene)
Wieslochia (Early Oligocene)
Passeriformes gen. et spp. indet. (Late Oligocene) – several suboscine and oscine species
Certhiops (Early Miocene of Germany) – basal Certhioidea
Passeriformes gen. et sp. indet. (Early/Middle Miocene) – suboscine?
Passeriformes gen. et spp. indet. (Early/Middle Miocene) – several species, oscine?
Passeriformes gen. et spp. indet. (Middle Miocene) – several species, basal?
Passeriformes gen. et spp. indet. (Middle Miocene) – several species, oscine?
Passeriformes gen. et spp. indet. (Late Miocene) – Sylvioidea
"Palaeostruthus" eurius (Pliocene)Eurylaimidae – broadbillsPlacement unresolvedEurylaimidae gen. et sp. indet. (Early Miocene)PalaeoscinidaePalaeoscinis (Late Miocene)Furnariidae – ovenbirds
†Pseudoseisuropsis 
†P. nehuen (Early Pleistocene of Argentina)
†P. cuelloi (Late Pleistocene of Uruguay)
†P. wintu (Early Pleistocene of Argentina)Prehistoric species of extant generaPseudoseisura cursor (Ensenada Early/Middle Pleistocene of Anchorena, Argentina)
Cinclodes major (Middle Pleistocene of Buenos Aires Province, Argentina)Menuridae – lyretailsExtant genera present in the fossil recordMenura (Early Miocene – Recent)Meliphagidae – honeyeatersPlacement unresolvedMeliphagidae gen. et spp. indet. (Middle/Late Miocene – Pliocene of Riversleigh, Australia) – at least 7 spp., some may be from extant generaOrthonychidae – logrunnersExtant genera present in the fossil recordOrthonyx (Middle/Late Miocene – Recent)Oriolidae – Old World orioles
Longmornis (Early Miocene of Riversleigh, Australia)Artamidae – woodswallows, butcherbirds, currawongs and Australian magpiePlacement unresolvedArtamidae gen. et sp. indet. (Early/Middle Miocene) – cracticineCorvidae – crows, ravens, jays and magpies
Miocorvus (Middle Miocene)
Miopica (Middle Miocene)
Miocitta (Late Miocene)
Protocitta (Early Pleistocene)
Henocitta (Middle Pleistocene)Extant genera present in the fossil recordCorvus (Late Miocene — Recent)
Pica (Late Pliocene/Early Pleistocene – Recent)
PyrrhocoraxPlacement unresolvedCorvidae gen. et sp. indet. (Early Pliocene)
Corvidae gen. et sp. indet. (Early/Middle Pleistocene) – probably belongs in extant genusLaniidae – shrikesExtant genera present in the fossil recordLanius (Early Miocene – Recent)Regulidae – kingletsExtant genera present in the fossil recordRegulus (Late Pliocene – Recent)Hirundinidae – swallows and martinsPlacement unresolvedHirundinidae gen. et spp. indet. (Early Pliocene of Langebaanweg, South Africa) – 2 speciesMegaluridae – grass-warblers and alliesExtant genera present in the fossil record?Locustella (Late Miocene – Recent)Acrocephalidae – marsh- and tree-warblersExtant genera present in the fossil record?Acrocephalus (Late Miocene – Recent)Muscicapidae – Old World flycatchers and chatsExtant genera present in the fossil recordLuscinia (Late Miocene – Recent)Turdidae – thrushesExtant genera present in the fossil record?Turdus (Middle? Miocene – Recent)Alaudidae – larks
Eremarida (Late Miocene of Hrabarsko, Bulgaria)Motacillidae – wagtailsExtant genera present in the fossil recordMotacillaFringillidae – finchesExtant genera present in the fossil recordLoxia (Late Pliocene – Recent)Additional prehistoric species of extant generaCoccothraustes simeonovi (Late Pliocene of Varshets, Bulgaria)
Coccothraustes balcanicusIcteridae – grackles and New World orioles
Pandanaris (Pleistocene)
Pyelorhamphus (Pleistocene)Extant genera present in the fossil recordEuphagus (Late Pleistocene – Recent)Cardinalidae – cardinalsPlacement unresolvedPasserina sp. (Early Pliocene of Yepómera, Mexico)Emberizidae – buntings and New World sparrows
Pampaemberiza (Middle Pleistocene of Necochea, Argentina)Extant genera present in the fossil recordAmmodramus (Late Miocene – Recent) – including PalaeostruthusAdditional prehistoric species of extant generaPipilo angelensis (Pleistocene of Rancho La Brea, US)

Avialans incertae sedis
These fossil taxa cannot be assigned to any major group with reasonable certainty. The "proto-birds" above are of some indeterminate basal position in the entire avialan (and paravian) radiation, but known from such diagnostic material that their relationships at the family level are known. In contrast, the taxa here have a hypodigm that is usually just sufficient for giving them a valid scientific name, but not for phylogenetic purposes beyond classing them as pygostylians or more modern birds. Some, however, are known from such fragmentary remains that the possibility that they are non-avian "reptiles" such as dinosaurs cannot be ruled out at present.
†"Ichthyornis" minusculus Nesov 1990 (Bissekty Late Cretaceous of Kyzyl Kum, Uzbekistan) – enantiornithine?
†Qinornis paleocenica Xue 1995 (Early/Middle Paleocene) – enantiornithine? neornithine?

See also
Bird ichnology
Dominant group (extinction)
Feathered dinosaurs
List of recently extinct birds
Late Quaternary prehistoric birds
List of paleognaths
List of Galliformes
List of Columbidae species
Flightless birds
Origin of birds
Prehistoric life

Footnotes

References
 Chiappe, Luis M. (2001): The rise of birds. In: Briggs, Derek E.G. & Crowther, P.R. (eds.): Palaeobiology II: A Synthesis: 102-106. Cambridge University Press, Cambridge, UK.
 Chiappe, Luis M. (2002): Basal bird phylogeny: problems and solutions. In: Chiappe, L.M. and Witmer, L.M. (eds.): Mesozoic Birds: Above the Heads of Dinosaurs: 448-472. University of California Press, Berkeley, US.
  Electronic Appendix
 Gauthier, Jacques A. & de Queiroz, Kevin (2001): Feathered dinosaurs, flying dinosaurs, crown dinosaurs, and the name "Aves". In: Gauthier, Jacques & Gall, L.F. (eds.): New Perspectives on the Origin and Early Evolution of Birds: Proceedings of the International Symposium in Honor of John H. Ostrom: 7-41. Peabody Museum of Natural History, Yale University, New Haven, Connecticut.
 Mortimer, Michael (2004): The Theropod Database: Phylogeny of taxa. Retrieved 2013-MAR-02.
 Olson, Storrs L. (1985): The fossil record of birds. In: Farner, D.S.; King, J.R. & Parkes, Kenneth C. (eds.): Avian Biology 8''': 79-238. Academic Press, New York. Not in copyright; PDF fulltext
 Sereno, Paul Callistus (2005): TaxonSearch: Stem Archosauria''. Version 1.0, November 7, 2005. Retrieved 2007-APR-30.

External links

 Aves Translation and Pronunciation Guide by Ben Creisler. Version of 2003-JUL-7. Retrieved 2007-SEP-1.
 
 

Fossil
  
Lists of prehistoric birds
Taxonomic lists (genera, taxonomic)
Ornithology lists